= William Stormont Hackett =

American lawyer

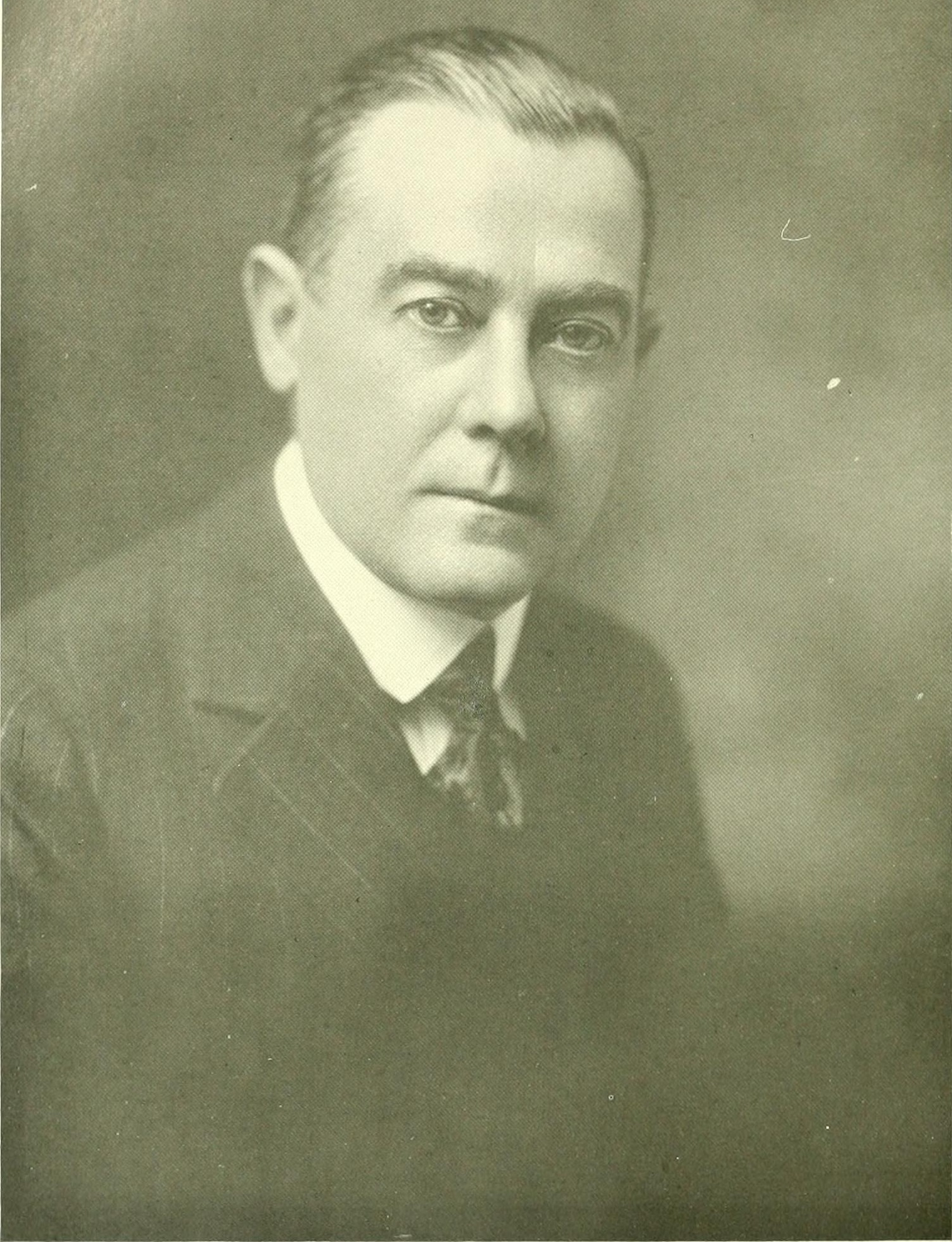
- Hackett as depicted in 1923's Encyclopedia of Biography of New York.

70th Mayor of Albany, New York
- In office January 1, 1922 – March 4, 1926
- Preceded by: James R. Watt
- Succeeded by: John Boyd Thacher II

Personal details
- Born: December 7, 1868 Albany, New York, U.S.
- Died: March 4, 1926 (aged 57) Havana, Cuba
- Resting place: Albany Rural Cemetery; Menands, New York
- Party: Democratic
- Occupation: Attorney; Banker; Businessman
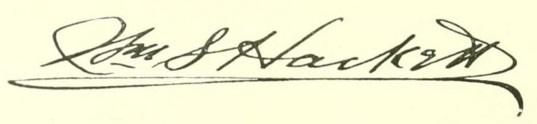
- Signature

Military service
- Allegiance: United States
- Branch/service: New York National Guard
- Years of service: 1890–1899
- Rank: Sergeant
- Unit: Company A, 10th Battalion

William Stormont Hackett (December 7, 1868 – March 4, 1926) was an American lawyer, banker, businessman and politician. A Democrat, he was most notable for serving as the 70th mayor of Albany, New York after winning an election in 1921 that ended control of Albany by the Republican organization headed by William Barnes Jr., and established the dominance of the Democratic organization led by Daniel P. O'Connell and Edwin Corning.

A native of Albany, Hackett was raised in the South End neighborhood and attended the local schools. After two years at Albany High School, he left school in order to begin studying law at an Albany firm. After attaining admission to the bar in 1889, Hackett began to practice in Albany. He also served in the New York National Guard, and attained the rank of sergeant in Albany's Company A, 10th Battalion. In addition to practicing law, Hackett was involved in several business and banking ventures, including serving as president of the Albany City Savings Institution, Albany City Safe Deposit Company, and New York Mortgage and Home Building Company.

A Democrat who was friendly with local party leader Daniel P. O'Connell, in 1921, Hackett agreed to become the party's candidate for mayor. His defeat of William Van Rensselaer Erving ended Republican control by party leader William Barnes Jr. and ushered in O'Connell's longtime dominance of the city and county governments. Hackett was reelected in 1923 and 1925, and was planning to campaign for the Democratic nomination for governor of New York in the 1928 elections when he was injured in a February 1926 automobile accident that occurred while he was vacationing in Cuba. He did not recover, and died from his injuries at a hospital in Havana on March 4, 1926. A lifelong bachelor, Hackett was buried at Albany Rural Cemetery.

== Early life ==
Hackett was born in Albany on December 7, 1868, the son of John Hackett and Martha Stormont. His family resided in Albany's South End neighborhood, and Hackett was educated in Albany. He began working while still a boy, including delivering the Albany Evening Journal newspaper, which was later owned by Republican Party leader William Barnes Jr.

After two years at Albany High School, Hackett dropped out in order to begin studying law in the office of Albany attorneys Amasa J. Parker Jr. and Edwin Countryman. He was admitted to the bar in 1889, and then practiced law in Albany.

Hackett also joined the New York National Guard, serving in Albany's Company A, 10th Battalion (formerly the Albany Zouave Cadets). He was a member of the unit from 1890 to 1899, and attained the rank of sergeant. Hackett later served as treasurer and president of Company A's veterans association.

A lifelong bachelor, Hackett was a member of the Baptist church, and became a lay preacher. He was also active in the Freemasons, and served as Master of Albany's Masters' Lodge Number 5 from 1900 to 1902. He was Master of the Albany chapter of Rose Croix, and Commander in Chief of the Albany consistory of the Scottish Rite Masons.

Hackett was a member of the Elks, the Fort Orange Club, the Albany Club, the Albany Country Club, and the Wolfert's Roost Country Club.

== Business career ==
In addition to practicing law, Hackett went into banking and business. He worked his way up the ranks of several companies, and served as president of the Albany City Savings Institution, the Albany City Safe Deposit Company, and the New York Mortgage and Home Building Company.

Hackett also served on the board of directors of the Union Trust Company and the Commerce Insurance Company. He was president of the Boulevard Garage Company, and treasurer and board of directors member for the Albany Chamber of Commerce.

== Political career ==
Hackett developed a friendship with Daniel P. O'Connell, another South End resident, who worked in the early 1900s to reestablish Albany's Democratic Party following over 20 years of domination by the Republican organization of William Barnes Jr., the grandson of Thurlow Weed.

In 1921 Hackett agreed to become the Democratic candidate for mayor. He was successful in the race against Republican William Van Rensselaer Erving, which enabled implementation of the O'Connell organization's longtime strategy of running wealthy non-ethnic Protestants like Edwin Corning, Parker Corning, and Erastus Corning 2nd for major offices including mayor and Congressman to enhance the respectability and credibility of a Democratic organization run by working class Irish-American, Catholic figures like O'Connell.

Hackett won reelection in 1923 and 1925. While campaigning for his third term, Hackett emerged as a likely candidate to be the Democratic nominee for Governor of New York in 1928, when incumbent Al Smith intended to be a candidate for President of the United States.

Hackett indicated to friends in late 1925 and early 1926 that he intended to enter the campaign for governor in 1928, presuming that Smith won reelection in 1926 and made the presidential race in 1928.

== Death ==
Hackett was visiting Cuba in February 1926 when, without warning, the car in which he was a passenger hit an obstruction or a rough patch of road. Hackett was ejected, and sustained severe head injuries. He lingered in a Havana hospital for about two weeks, but succumbed to his injuries on March 4, 1926.

Hackett's remains were returned to Albany, and he was buried at Albany Rural Cemetery, section 108, lot 80.

=== Political ramifications ===
As a result of Hackett's death, the Democratic Party in New York next turned to Edwin Corning as their likely nominee for governor in 1928. Corning was a leader of the O'Connell organization, and had been elected Lieutenant Governor in 1926. However, Corning began to suffer health problems, and declined to become a candidate. As a result of Hackett's death and Corning's poor health, in 1928 New York Democrats attempted to recruit several other prominent politicians to run, including Robert F. Wagner, George R. Lunn, and Peter G. Ten Eyck. After those efforts failed, the party turned to Franklin D. Roosevelt to make the 1928 governor's race. He was nominated by acclimation at the state party convention, and went on to defeat Republican Albert Ottinger in the general election.

== Legacy ==
Albany's William S. Hackett Junior High School (now Middle School) was constructed on Delaware Avenue in 1926, and was named in Hackett's honor.

Hackett Boulevard, an Albany street which runs from Holland Avenue to South Manning Boulevard, then from South Manning Boulevard to New Scotland Avenue is also named for Hackett.
