= Edwin Corning Jr. =

American state legislator

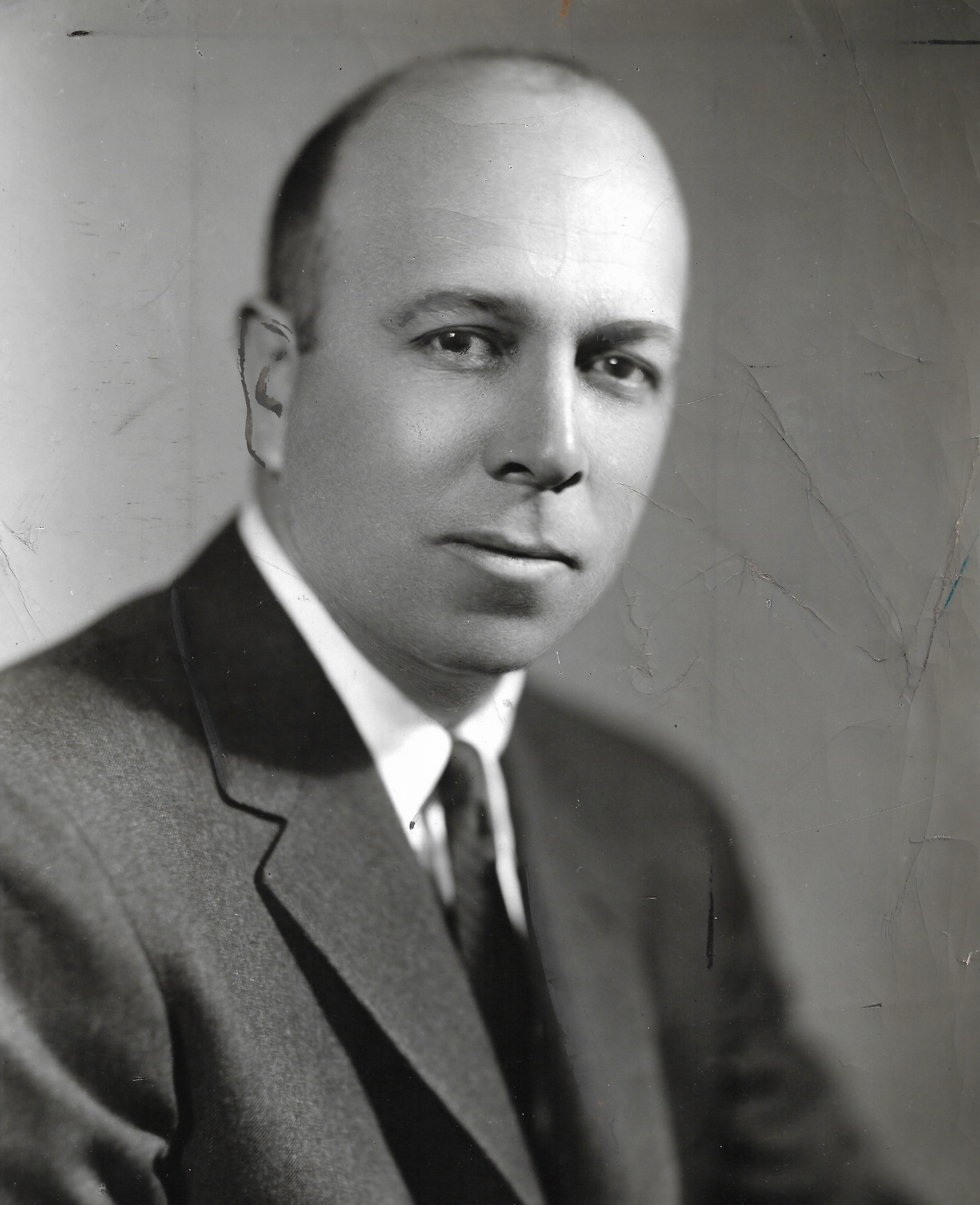
- Albany Art Union photo, 1958

Member of the New York State Assembly from Albany County's 1st District
- In office January 1, 1955 – August 26, 1959
- Preceded by: D-Cady Herrick 2nd
- Succeeded by: Frank P. Cox

Personal details
- Born: September 26, 1919 Albany, New York
- Died: January 31, 1964 (aged 44) Clarksville, New York
- Resting place: Albany Rural Cemetery, Menands, New York
- Party: Democratic
- Spouse: Barbara May Thomson (m. 1950-1964, his death)
- Relations: Erastus Corning 2nd (brother); Parker Corning (uncle); Erastus Corning (great-grandfather); Amasa J. Parker (great-grandfather)
- Children: 2
- Parent(s): Edwin Corning; Louise Maxwell Corning
- Education: Yale University
- Profession: Business executive

Military service
- Allegiance: United States
- Branch/service: United States Navy
- Years of service: 1942–1946
- Rank: Lieutenant
- Battles/wars: World War II: Pacific theater

Edwin Corning Jr. (September 26, 1919 – January 31, 1964) was an American businessman, United States Navy officer and Democratic politician from Albany, New York. A member of the prominent Corning family, he was most notable for his service as a member of the New York State Assembly from 1955 to 1959.

== Biography ==
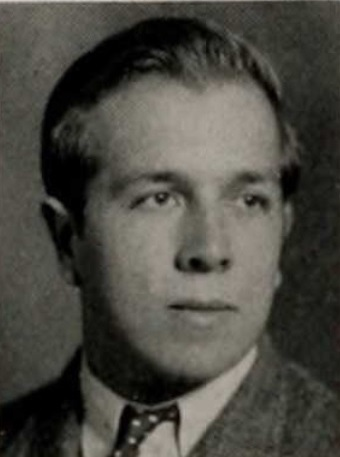
Corning in the 1939 Yale University yearbook

Edwin Corning Jr. was born in Albany, New York on September 26, 1919, the son of Edwin Corning and Louise (Maxwell) Corning. He was educated at The Albany Academy and the Groton School and was a 1942 graduate of Yale College.

Corning joined the United States Navy for World War II. He enlisted in 1942, and received a commission as an ensign. Corning participated in combat in the Pacific theater, and attained the rank of lieutenant before receiving his discharge in 1946. In January 1946, Corning's name appeared among a list of Navy officers who were passengers aboard USS LST 589 when it sailed from Qingdao to Shanghai.

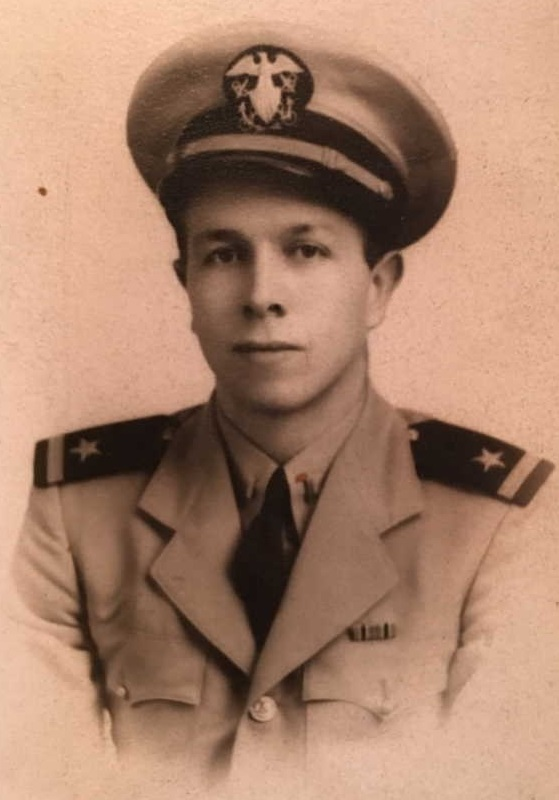
Corning as a Navy ensign in 1942

After the war, Corning returned to Albany, where he became active in the Albany Associates insurance agency, a Corning family business. He became vice president of the company, in addition to serving on its board of directors. He also served as a director of several other companies, including the Niagara Mohawk Power Corporation and Albany's First Trust Company.

A Democrat, in 1954, Corning was the successful nominee to represent Albany County's first district in the New York State Assembly. He was reelected in 1956 and 1958, and served from January 1955 until resigning in August 1959.

In May, 1959, Corning was involved in a car accident on U.S. Route 9 near Boght Corners. He sustained severe injuries and was hospitalized for several months. Citing the amount of time he needed to devote to his recovery, Corning resigned his Assembly seat in order to give officials the opportunity to hold a special election prior to the start of the next session in January 1960, thus ensuring that his district would continue to be represented.

== Death and burial ==
After his car accident, Corning curtailed most of his business and political activities, and was a resident of Clarksville. He died at his home in Clarksville on January 31, 1964, and was buried at Albany Rural Cemetery in Menands, New York.

== Family ==
In 1950, Corning married Barbara May Thomson (1923–2012). They were the parents of two children, daughter Jamie and son Edwin.

Corning's family was long prominent in Albany-area politics and business. In addition to his father's service as Lieutenant Governor of New York, Corning's brother Erastus Corning 2nd was the longtime mayor of Albany. His uncle Parker Corning served as a member of the United States House of Representatives from New York for 14 years. Corning's great-grandfather, Amasa J. Parker served in Congress and enjoyed a long career as a state court judge. Another great-grandfather, Erastus Corning was a member of Congress and mayor of Albany.

== Sources ==
=== Newspapers ===
- "Wedding Announcement, Edwin Corning and Barbara May Thomson". Poughkeepsie Journal. Poughkeepsie, NY. May 28, 1950 – via Newspapers.com.
- "Corning's Brother Badly Hurt Near Albany". Poughkeepsie, NY. Associated Press. May 28, 1959 – via Newspapers.com.
- "Corning Still Critical". The Times Record. Troy, NY. June 12, 1959 – via Newspapers.com.
- "Corning Resigns as Assemblyman". Daily Freeman. Kingston, NY. Associated Press. August 27, 1959 – via Newspapers.com.
- "Corning Leaves Albany Hospital". The Times Record. Troy, NY. October 6, 1959 – via Newspapers.com.
- "Brother of Albany Mayor Dies". The Times Record. Troy, NY. February 1, 1964 – via Newspapers.com.

=== Books ===
- Grondahl, Paul (2007). Mayor Erastus Corning: Albany Icon, Albany Enigma. Albany, NY: State University of New York Press. ISBN 978-0-7914-7294-1.
- New York Secretary of State (1957). The New York Red Book for 1957-58. Albany, NY: Williams Press.

=== Internet ===
- "U.S. World War II Navy Muster Rolls, 1938-1949, 1946 Entry for Edwin Corning". Ancestry.com. Lehi, UT: Ancestry.com LLC. January 12, 1946.
