= William Seymour (New York politician) =

American politician (1775–1848)

Member of the U.S. House of Representatives from New York's 20th district
- In office March 4, 1835 – March 3, 1837
- Preceded by: Noadiah Johnson
- Succeeded by: Amasa J. Parker

Personal details
- Born: February 22, 1775 Waterbury, Connecticut Colony, British America
- Died: December 28, 1848 (aged 73) Binghamton, New York, U.S.
- Resting place: Glenwood Cemetery
- Party: Jacksonian
- Occupation: Lawyer, politician

William Seymour (February 22, 1775 – December 28, 1848) was an American lawyer, jurist, and politician who served one term as a United States representative from New York from 1835 to 1837.

== Early life ==
He was born in Waterbury in the Connecticut Colony on February 22, 1775, the son of David Seymour and Achsah (née Welton) Seymour. Around 1793, he moved to Windsor, New York, attended public schools, studied law under Daniel LeRoy, was admitted to the bar.

== Career ==
After admission to the bar, Seymour commenced practice in Binghamton. He returned to Windsor in 1807 and served as justice of the peace. In 1833, upon his appointment as first judge of the Court of Common Pleas of Broome County, he returned to Binghamton.

Seymour was elected as one of the first trustees of the village in 1834.

=== Congress ===
He was elected as a Jacksonian to the Twenty-fourth Congress (March 4, 1835 – March 3, 1837). He again served as first judge of Broome County until 1847, then resumed the practice of his profession in Binghamton where he died.

== Personal life ==
Seymour was married to Esther Beecher (1786–1823), a daughter of Justus Beecher and Sarah (née Hotchkiss) Beecher, Connecticut natives who also moved to Windsor, New York. Together, Esther and William were the parents of:

- William N. Seymour (1808–1886), who married Anna Maria Seymour (1810–1877).

== Death and burial ==
Seymour died in Binghamton on December 28, 1848. He was interred at Binghamton Cemetery, and later reinterred at Glenwood Cemetery in Dickinson, New York.

U.S. House of Representatives
Preceded by Noadiah Johnson	Member of the U.S. House of Representatives from New York's 20th congressional district March 4, 1835 – March 3, 1837	Succeeded by Amasa J. Parker
