= Parker Corning =

American politician

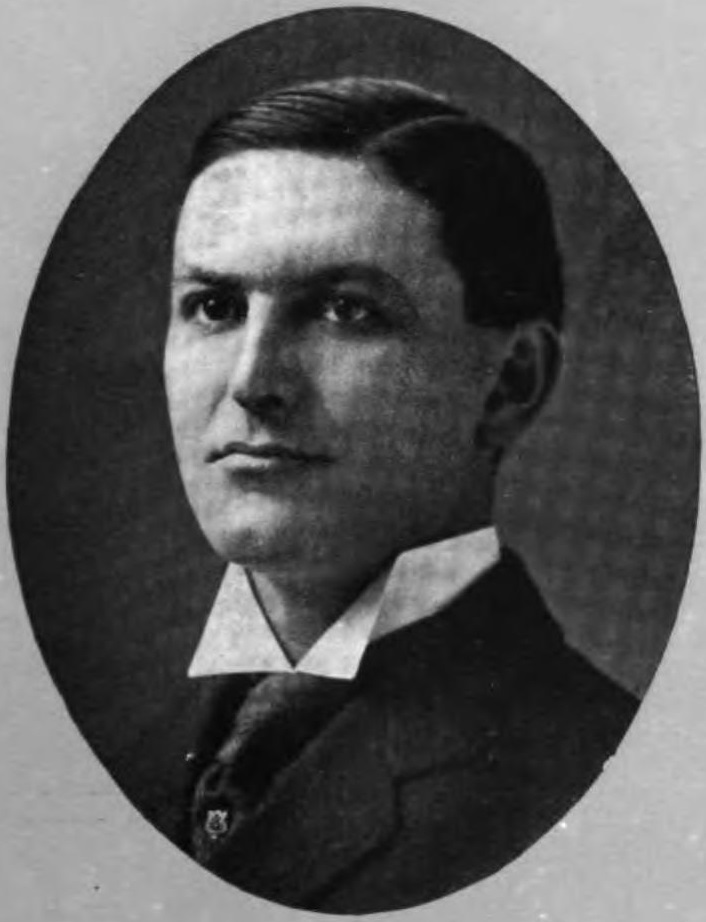
- From 1910's New York State Men by Frederick S. Hills

Member of the U.S. House of Representatives from New York's 28th district
- In office March 4, 1923 – January 3, 1937
- Preceded by: Peter G. Ten Eyck
- Succeeded by: William T. Byrne

Personal details
- Born: January 22, 1874 Albany, New York
- Died: May 24, 1943 (aged 69) Albany, New York
- Resting place: Albany Rural Cemetery, Menands, New York
- Party: Democratic
- Spouse: Anna Austin Cassin McClure (m. 1910-1943, her death)
- Relations: Erastus Corning (Grandfather); Amasa J. Parker (Grandfather); Edwin Corning (Brother); Erastus Corning 2nd (Nephew); Edwin Corning Jr. (nephew)
- Children: 1
- Education: Yale College
- Occupation: Businessman

Parker Corning (January 22, 1874 – May 24, 1943) was an American businessman and politician from Albany, New York. He is most notable for his service as a United States representative from New York from 1923 to 1937.

A member of the Albany area's prominent Corning family, he became identified with several business ventures that made him wealthy, most notably Albany Felt Company. Active in politics in the Democratic organization run by Daniel P. O'Connell and Corning's brother Edwin Corning, in 1922 Parker Corning was a successful candidate for Congress. Known initially for his efforts to obtain federal funding for the Port of Albany–Rensselaer and other New York projects, during the latter portion of his Congressional tenure he became known as one of the few Democrats opposed to President Franklin D. Roosevelt and the New Deal. Corning did not run for reelection in 1936 and returned to his business interests.

== Early life ==
Corning was born in Albany, New York on January 22, 1874, a son of Erastus Corning (1827–1897) and Mary (Parker) Corning (1845–1899). He attended The Albany Academy and St. Paul's School in Concord, New Hampshire, from which he graduated in 1891. Corning then attended Yale College, from which he graduated in 1895.

== Business career ==
Corning was a founder of Albany Felt Company (now Albany International Corporation), which produced felts for industrial uses, including paper machines. The Corning family provided most of the company's founding capital, including cash, wool from sheep raised on the family farm, and the land on which the first factory was built. The company's longtime vice president and treasurer, and its president after 1918, by the time of his death he had overseen Albany Felt's growth into a multi-million dollar enterprise with a worldwide customer base.

In addition to his interests with Albany Felt, Corning was active in several other businesses, including serving on the board of directors of the New York State National Bank and the City Safe Deposit Company, and the board of trustees of the Mechanics and Farmers' Savings Bank. In addition, Corning was a vice president of the Ludlum Steel Company and president of Bishop, Friedman & Bergstrom, a company dealing in scrap iron and steel. Corning was also involved in several civic projects, including serving on the board of trustees of the Albany City Homeopathic Hospital and the Albany Rural Cemetery Association.

== Congressman ==
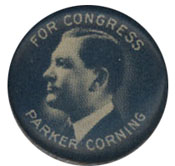
Campaign button for Parker Corning for Congress.

Corning was elected as a Democrat to the 68th and to the six succeeding Congresses, and served from March 4, 1923 to January 3, 1937. A member of the prominent House Interstate and Foreign Commerce Committee, Corning used his influence to enhance the Port of Albany–Rensselaer and obtain a new federal building in Albany. A longtime friend of Governor Al Smith, during Smith's governorship Corning worked to obtain approval of a new state office building in Albany. When the facility was completed, it was christened the Alfred E. Smith Building. Corning also obtained federal funding for other projects, including the first Dunn Memorial Bridge and the Menands Bridge.

A member of the conservative Albany County party organization controlled by the Corning family and Daniel P. O'Connell, Corning was also notable during his House service as an opponent of Franklin D. Roosevelt and the New Deal. Corning's opposition stemmed partly from loyalty to Smith, whose relationship with Roosevelt soured after Roosevelt became president, and partly because of Corning's more conservative economic outlook. He was not a candidate for renomination in 1936, and returned to his business interests.

== Death and burial ==
Corning died in Albany on May 24, 1943, shortly after the death of his wife. Corning was buried at Albany Rural Cemetery, Section 31, Lot 2.

== Family ==
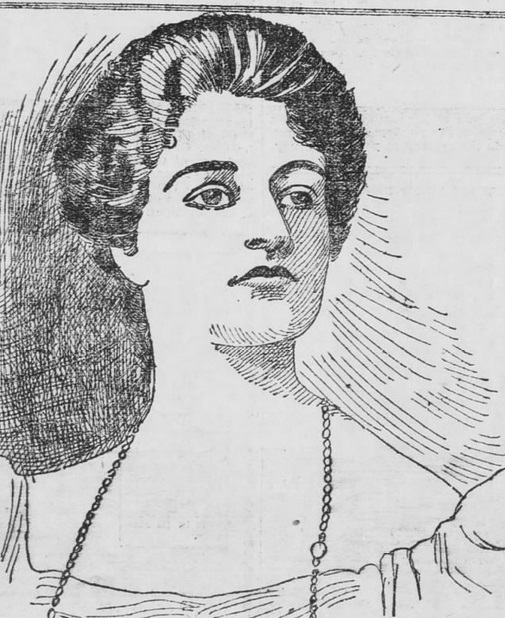
Anna Cassin Corning. December 1899 newspaper illustration.

On November 1, 1910, Parker Corning married Mrs. Anne "Anna" Austin Cassin McClure, who had been married to Archibald Jermain McClure before obtaining a divorce. With her first husband, Mrs. Corning was the mother of a son, Barclay Jermain McClure (1900–1966). With her second husband, she was the mother of a daughter, Mary Parker Corning (1912–1984).

Anna Cassin was renowned for her physical beauty. Archibald McClure, the son of a man who had grown wealthy in the wholesale drug business in Albany, had never met her before he decided to marry her after seeing a magazine photo, and ended a visit to California so he could return to New York and make her acquaintance. By 1910, she was a single mother with little money. She was also Catholic, while the Cornings were Episcopal. When Corning proposed, his family tried to persuade him not to follow through. After the wedding, Corning's sister Harriet never spoke to him again.

Corning's grandfathers Erastus Corning and Amasa J. Parker were also U.S. Representatives from New York. His brother Edwin Corning was Lieutenant Governor of New York, and his nephew Erastus Corning 2nd was Mayor of Albany. Another nephew, Edwin Corning Jr., served in the New York State Assembly from 1955 to 1959.

== Horse racing ==
Parker and Anna Corning raised and raced thoroughbred horses. Their best known mounts were Thanksgiving, the winner of the 1938 Travers Stakes, and Attention, who beat Triple Crown winner Whirlaway to place first in the 1941 Arlington Classic.

== Sources ==
=== Books ===
- Fitch, Charles E. (1916). Encyclopedia of Biography of New York. Boston, MA: American Historical Society. pp. 34–35.
- Grondahl, Paul (2007). Mayor Erastus Corning: Albany Icon, Albany Enigma. Albany, NY: State University of New York Press. ISBN 978-0-7914-7294-1.
- Hills, Frederick Simon (1910). New York State Men. Vol. 1. Albany, NY: The Argus Company. p. 232 – via HathiTrust.

=== Newspapers ===
- "Fell in Love with a Photograph". St. Paul Globe. Saint Paul, MN. December 24, 1899. p. 13 – via Newspapers.com.
- "Mrs. McClure Weds Here". The New York Times. New York, NY. November 1, 1910. p. 9 – via Newspapers.com.
- "Picture Ideal Wed Again". Chanute Daily Tribune. Chanute, KS. November 3, 1910. p. 5 – via Newspapers.com.
- "Former Congressman Corning Dies". The Troy Record. Troy, NY. May 25, 1943. p. 3 – via Newspapers.com.
- "Brother of Albany Mayor Dies". The Times Record. Troy, NY. February 1, 1964. p. 5 – via Newspapers.com.
- "Obituary, Barclay J. McClure". The News-Press. Fort Myers, FL. January 21, 1966. p. 2A – via Newspapers.com.
- "Obituary, Mary Corning Howard". The Baltimore Sun. Baltimore, MD. May 25, 1984. p. C7 – via Newspapers.com.

=== Internet ===
- "Burial Cards, 1791-2011, Entry for Parker Corning". Menands, NY: Albany Rural Cemetery – via Ancestry.com.

U.S. House of Representatives
Preceded by Peter G. Ten Eyck	Member of the U.S. House of Representatives from New York's 28th congressional district 1923–1937	Succeeded by William T. Byrne
