= Erastus Corning =

American politician and businessman (1794–1872)

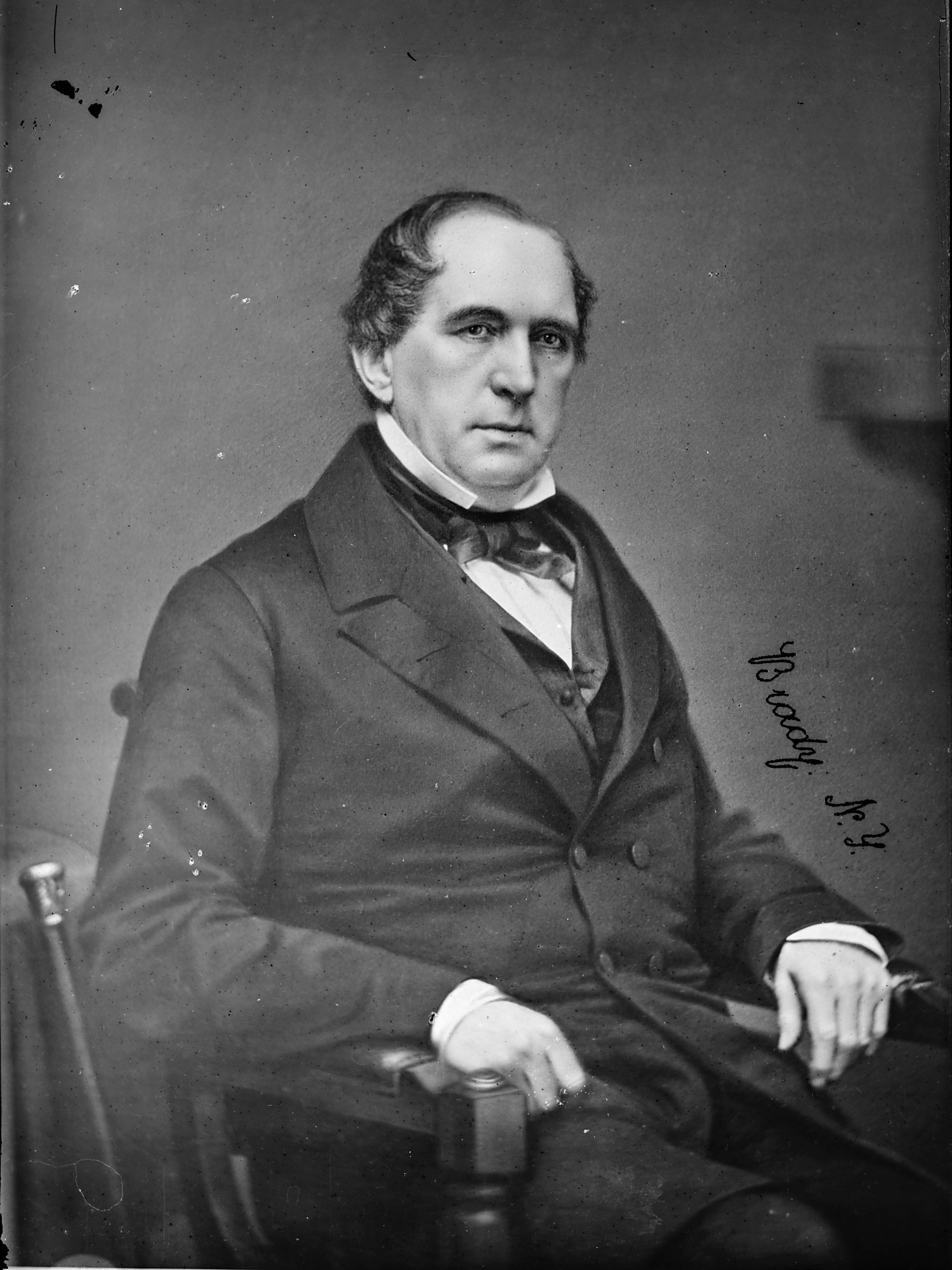
- Portrait of Erastus Corning by Mathew Brady, c. 1860

Member of the U.S. House of Representatives from New York's 14th district
- In office March 4, 1861 – October 5, 1863
- Preceded by: John H. Reynolds
- Succeeded by: John V. L. Pruyn
- In office March 4, 1857 – March 3, 1859
- Preceded by: Samuel Dickson
- Succeeded by: John H. Reynolds

Member of the New York Senate from the 3rd district
- In office 1842–1845
- Preceded by: Friend Humphrey
- Succeeded by: William H. Van Schoonhoven

Mayor of Albany, New York
- In office 1834–1837
- Preceded by: Francis Bloodgood
- Succeeded by: Teunis Van Vechten

Personal details
- Born: December 14, 1794 Norwich, Connecticut, US
- Died: April 9, 1872 (aged 77) Albany, New York, US
- Resting place: Albany Rural Cemetery; Menands, New York
- Party: Democratic
- Spouse: Harriet Weld (m. 1819)
- Relations: Edwin Corning (grandson); Parker Corning (grandson); Erastus Corning 2nd (great-grandson); Edwin Corning Jr. (great-grandson)
- Children: 5
- Profession: Businessman; Politician

Erastus Corning (December 14, 1794 – April 9, 1872) was an American businessman and politician from Albany, New York. A Democrat, he was most notable for his service as mayor of Albany from 1834 to 1837, in the New York State Senate from 1842 to 1845, and two nonconsecutive terms in the United States House of Representatives from 1857 to 1859, and from 1861 to 1863.

Corning was a delegate to the 1860 Democratic National Convention and to the Peace Conference of 1861, which attempted to prevent the American Civil War. Though he was a Democrat and President Abraham Lincoln was a Republican, once the war started, Corning supported the Union while also criticizing what he viewed as the Lincoln administration's excesses.

== Early life ==
Corning was born in Norwich, Connecticut, the son of Bliss Corning and Lucinda (Smith) Corning. At age two, Corning fell from his crib and injured a hip, which required him to walk with crutches. He was unable to walk unaided for more than a few steps, but this physical limitation was generally not referred to in the press. As an adult, he taught himself to walk with a cane, which enabled him to rely less on his crutches.

Corning attended academies in Norwich and Chatham, New York, and moved to Troy, New York, at the age of thirteen to clerk in the hardware store of his uncle, Benjamin Smith. Six years later he moved to Albany, New York, where he joined the mercantile business of James Spencer. After some time at Spencer's firm, Corning became a partner, and the senior partner upon Spencer's death in 1824. Corning combined the Spencer firm with holdings he inherited from his uncle to form Erastus Corning & Co. John V. L. Pruyn was married to Harriet Corning Turner, who was Erastus Corning's niece. As a result of this family connection, Corning and Pruyn were often partners in business ventures and investments, which grew to include insurance, banking, land speculation, and land development.

== Erastus Corning & Co. ==
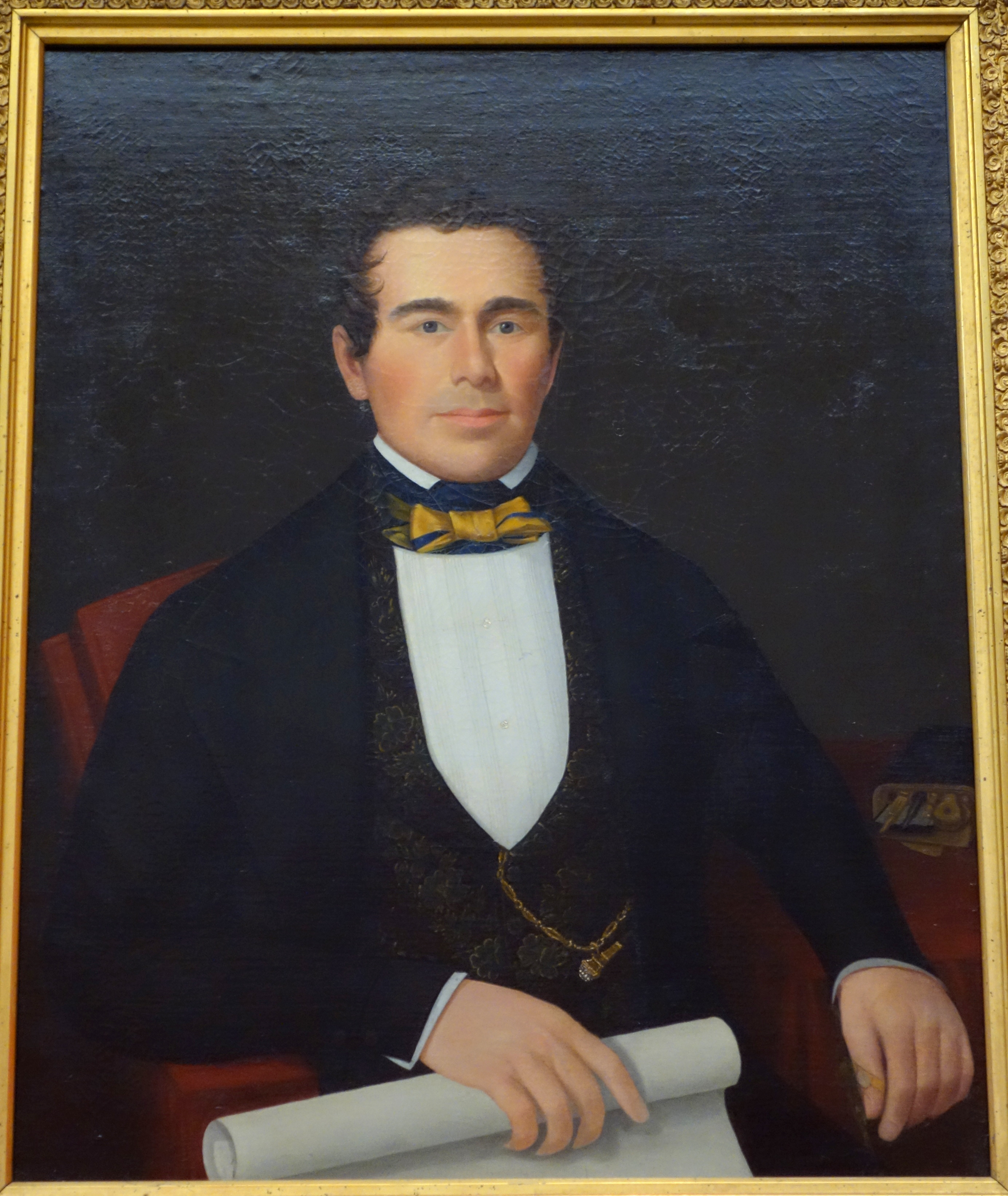
Portrait of Corning c. 1840–1845

Erastus Corning & Co. bought and sold all types of iron products, including tools, nails, stoves, farming implements, and eventually railroad track rails and railroad car parts. The company had a wharf and warehouse on the Hudson River in Albany, and the store served not only Albany and the surrounding towns, but hundreds of large customers from the west who visited Albany only two or three times a year to buy and sell products, restock their own supplies, and see what new items were for sale.

Corning also invested in banks and insurance companies. He purchased the Albany Rolling and Slitting Mill, renamed it the Albany Nail Factory, and used it to corner the market on numerous iron products he sold at his store. The Albany Nail Factory eventually became the Rensselaer Iron Works, which under Corning's guidance installed the first Bessemer converter in the United States.

By the time he was 40, Corning had helped found the Albany City Bank, of which he served as president until his death. He had also been appointed to the board of regents for the University of the State of New York, begun speculating on land in western New York, including what are now the town of Corning and city of Corning. A Democrat, Corning also served a term as an Albany alderman beginning in 1828, then served as mayor from 1834 until 1837.

== Railroads ==
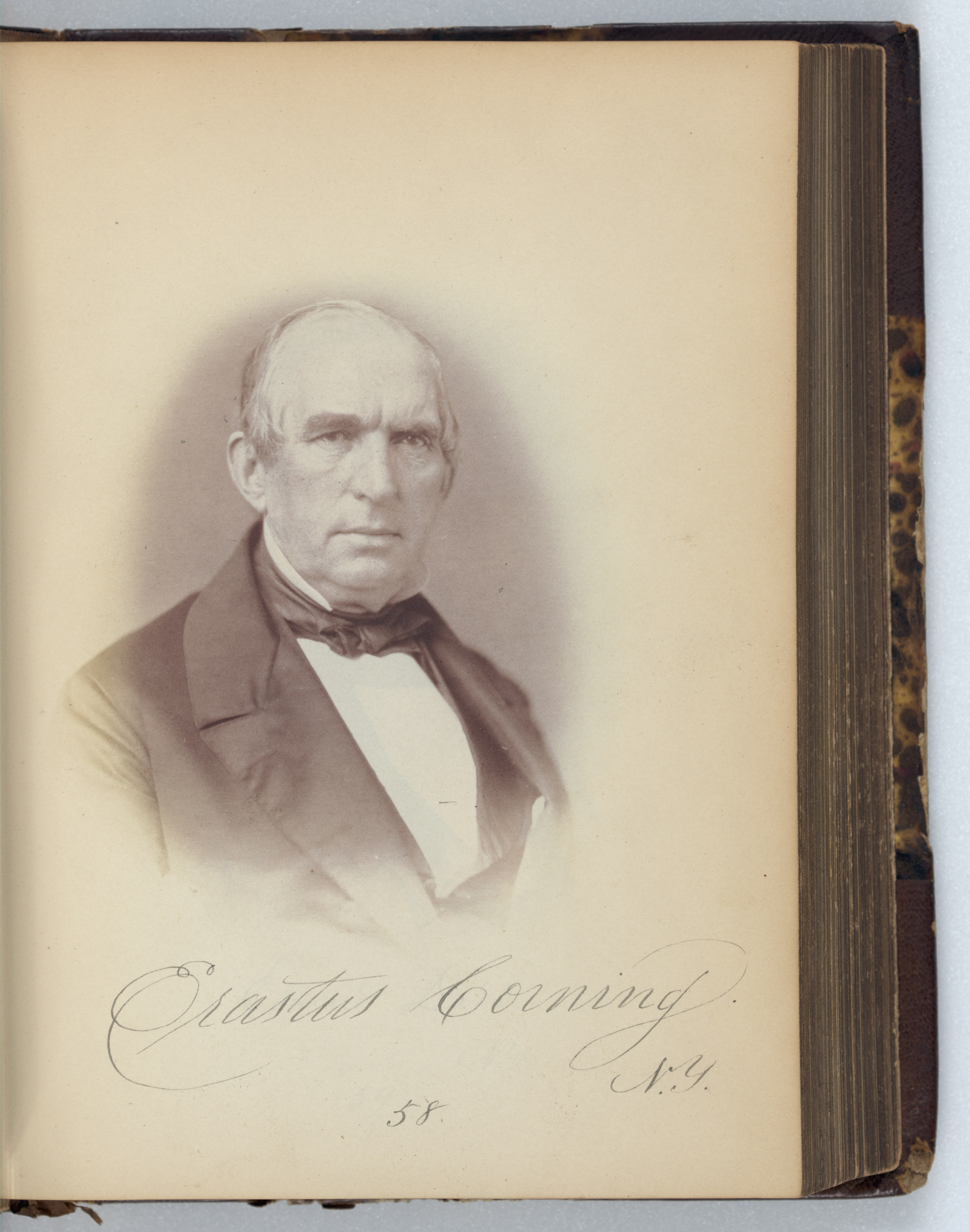
Corning during his first Congressional term in 1859

As an iron dealer, Corning saw the potential of railroads as both a consumer and distributor of his products. When the Utica and Schenectady Railroad was chartered in 1833, Corning was a major investor and served as president and a member of the board of directors. Corning was also a shareholder in and president of the smaller Mohawk and Hudson Railroad. In 1851, the two roads were reorganized as the Mohawk Valley Railroad, of which Corning was president.

Corning remained active in politics, and was a member of the New York State Senate from 1842 to 1845, sitting in the 65th, 66th, 67th and 68th New York State Legislatures. His time in state politics convinced him that the system of local and regional railroads covering upstate New York was inefficient and could be made far more profitable by consolidation. In an effort to create efficiencies that would improve profitability, Corning began planning the New York Central Railroad, what eventually became the largest corporation in America. Corning was a delegate to the Democratic National Convention in 1848 and again in 1852.

In 1853, Corning succeeded in persuading shareholders and executives of six functioning railroads and two that had been planned but were not yet constructed to agree to a plan for consolidating their companies. Corning was the main lobbyist who pursued approval by the New York State Legislature. Though he was a Democrat, Corning appealed for help to Thurlow Weed, the leader of New York's Whigs, who controlled the state government. Thanks to the efforts of Corning and Weed, the legislature passed the Consolidation Act on April 2, 1853. As the largest shareholder in the new company, Corning became its first president. He remained in the post for twelve years, during which the New York Central's expansion and connections with other railways gave it access to cities from New York City to Chicago, which made it one of the country's most important railroads.

Corning amassed a significant fortune, and used it to invest in land as far west as Wisconsin and Iowa. He bought large shares in the Chicago, Burlington and Quincy Railroad and the Michigan Central Railroad, and was the largest shareholder in and president of the St. Mary's Falls Ship Canal Company. The canal company constructed the canal and locks on the St. Mary's River at Sault Ste. Marie, Michigan, which connected Lake Superior with Lake Huron. The canal company received 750,000 acres (3,000 km^{2}) of land in the west; which included 100,000 acres (400 km^{2}) for Corning.

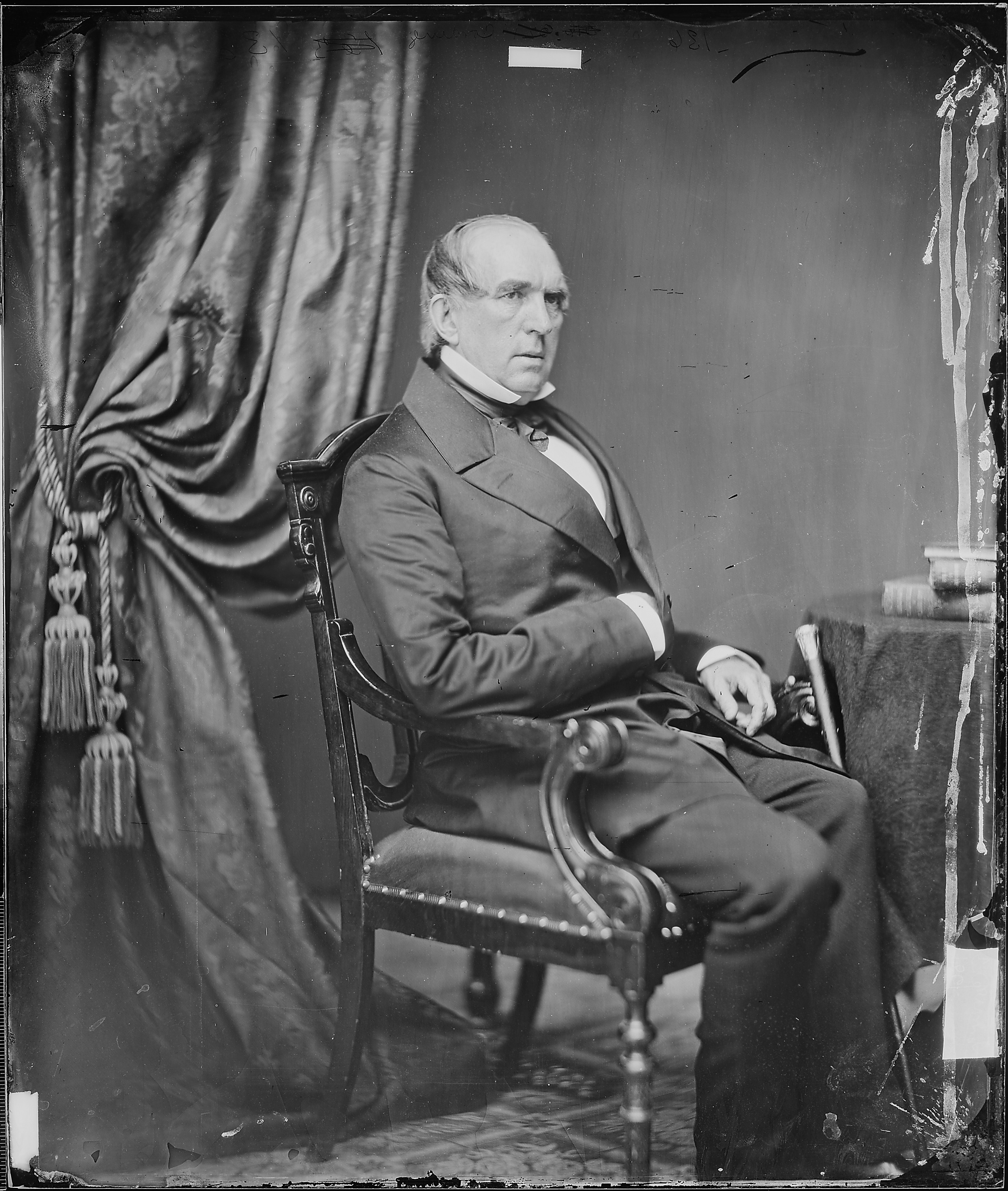
Hon. Erastus Corning

== Civil War ==
In 1856 Corning was elected to the 35th Congress, and he served one term, March 4, 1857, to March 3, 1859. He was an unsuccessful candidate for reelection in 1858, but was elected to a second term in 1860. He served in the 37th Congress from March 4, 1861, until resigning on October 5, 1863.

Corning was a delegate to the 1860 Democratic National Convention. In 1861, he was a delegate to the Peace Congress in Washington, D.C. Though he was a Democrat, once the American Civil War began, he supported the Union while also criticizing what he viewed as the excesses of Republican President Abraham Lincoln's administration. He resigned his seat in Congress before the end of his second term because of failing health and because of his disagreements with Lincoln's prosecution of the war. In February 1863, Corning was the Democratic caucus nominee for U.S. Senator from New York, but Republicans controlled the state legislature, and Corning was defeated by Republican Edwin D. Morgan, 86 votes to 70, with one cast for John Adams Dix and one for Daniel S. Dickinson.

In the spring of 1863, Corning organized a public meeting on Lincoln's conduct, which passed resolutions in support of the Union but was critical of several Lincoln policies, including military arrests rather than civilian court trials for individuals accused of desertion or avoiding military conscription. Lincoln replied in a lengthy letter that set out his views on what the Constitution allowed a president to do during wartime. In the reply, Lincoln argued for the necessity of arresting anti-government agitators including Clement Vallandigham, famously asking "Must I shoot a simple-minded deserter, while I must not touch a hair of a wily agitator who induces him to desert?"

Despite disagreeing with Lincoln on how to prosecute the war, Corning fully supported the effort to maintain the Union. When the United States Navy decided to pursue construction of ironclad ships in 1862, John Ericsson contracted with Corning's partners John F. Winslow and John Augustus Griswold to manufacture parts and materials for USS Monitor.

== Later years ==
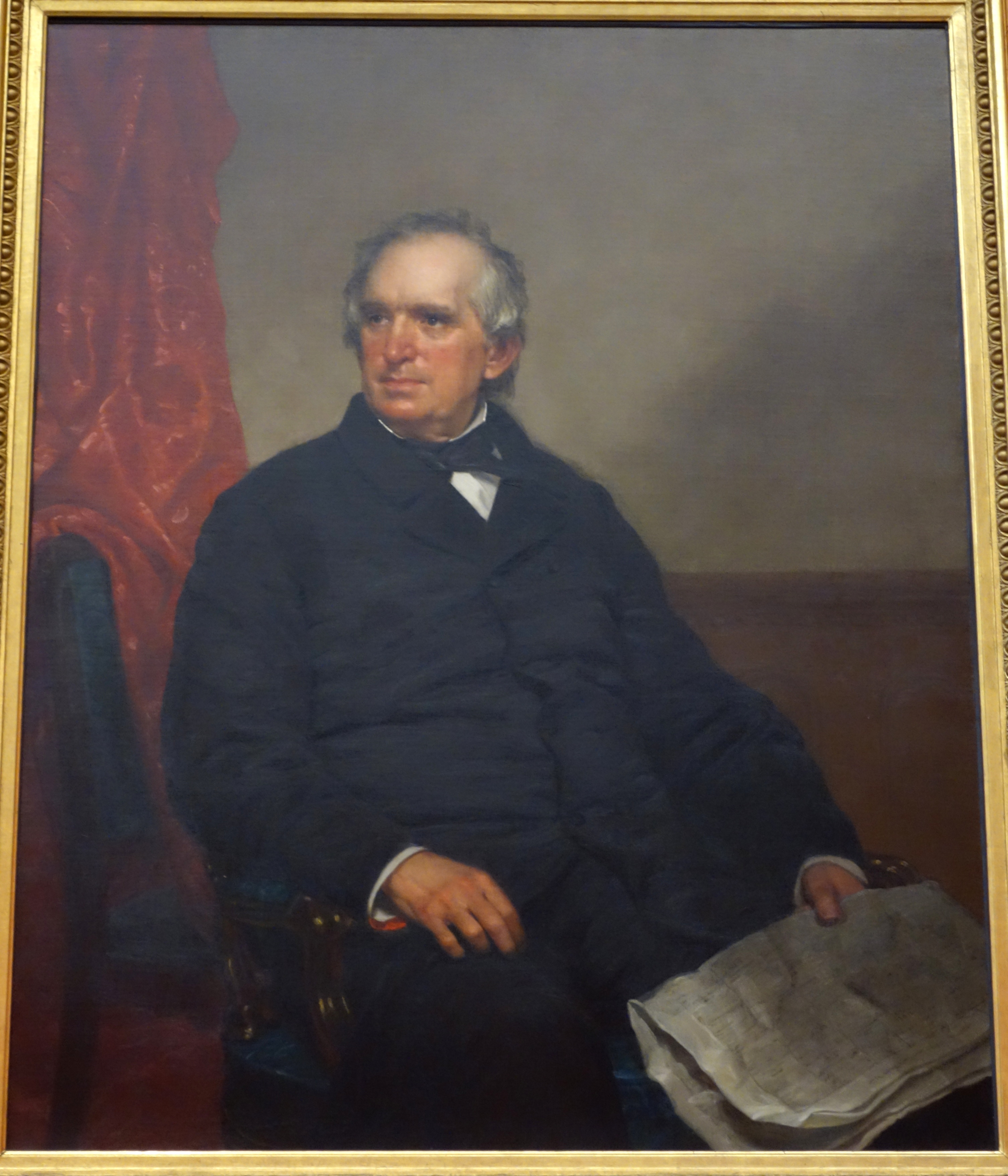
Portrait of Corning later in life

From the mid-1860s on, Corning reduced the scope of his business dealings, though he remained as president of the Albany City Bank and its successor, and continued as vice chancellor of the University of the State of New York Board of Regents. He died at his home in Albany on April 8, 1872. Corning was buried at Albany Rural Cemetery.

== Family ==
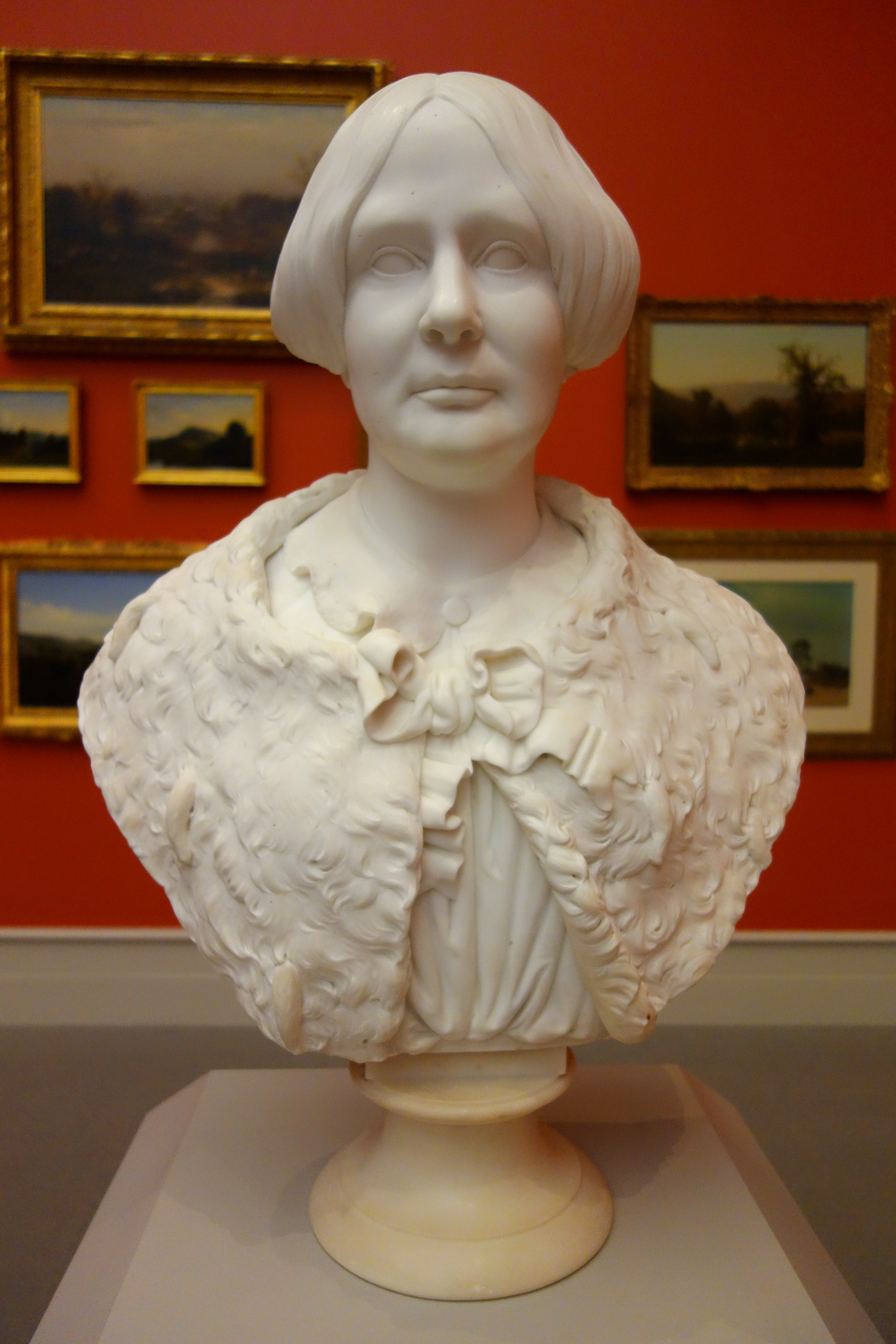
1856 sculpture of Harriet Weld Corning

In 1819, Corning married Harriet Weld (1794-1883). They were the parents of five children:

- Benjamin (1820-1821)
- John (1823-1833)
- Erastus Jr. (1827-1897)
- Joseph (1829-1830)
- Edwin (1836-1871)

After Corning's death, his son Erastus Corning Jr. (1827-1897) succeeded to management of Corning's business interests. He did not manage them successfully, but after his death his sons Edwin and Parker succeeded in restoring the family's wealth. Both were active in politics as Democrats, and helped found a party organization that ran Albany and the surrounding Albany County for decades. Edwin Corning served as lieutenant governor of New York from 1927 to 1928, and Parker Corning served in the United States House of Representatives from 1923 to 1937.

Corning's great-grandsons, Edwin Corning's sons Erastus 2nd and Edwin Jr., were also active in Albany-area business and politics. Edwin Jr. served in the New York State Assembly from 1955 to 1959, and Erastus 2nd was mayor of Albany for over 40 years, from 1941 to 1983.

== Legacy ==
The Erastus Corning I papers are included in the collections of the Albany Institute of History & Art.

== See also ==
- List of mayors of Albany, New York
- History of Albany, New York
- List of railroad executives

New York State Senate
| Preceded by Friend Humphrey | New York State Senate; Third District (Class 3); 1842–1845 | Succeeded by William H. Van Schoonhoven |
U.S. House of Representatives
| Preceded by Samuel Dickson | Member of the U.S. House of Representatives from New York's 14th congressional district 1857–1859 | Succeeded by John H. Reynolds |
| Preceded by John H. Reynolds | Member of the U.S. House of Representatives from New York's 14th congressional district 1861–1863 | Succeeded by John V. L. Pruyn |
