= John Hazard Reynolds =

American attorney and politician from New York

John H. Reynolds
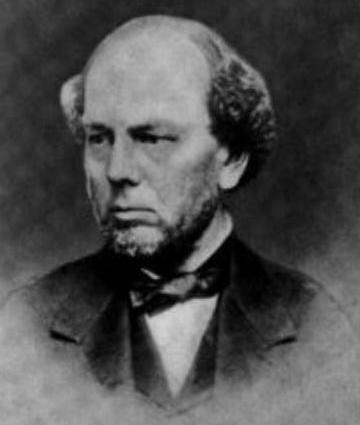
- From 1914's A History of Old Kinderhook

Member of the United States House of Representatives from New York's 14th District
- In office March 4, 1859 – March 3, 1861
- Preceded by: Erastus Corning
- Succeeded by: Erastus Corning

Personal details
- Born: June 19, 1819 Moreau, New York
- Died: September 24, 1875 (aged 56) Kinderhook, New York
- Resting place: Kinderhook Cemetery, Kinderhook, New York
- Party: Democratic
- Spouse: Margaret Ann Whiting (m. 1843)
- Children: 6
- Education: Kinderhook Academy
- Profession: Attorney

John Hazard Reynolds (June 21, 1819 – September 24, 1875) was an American attorney and politician from New York. He was most notable for his service as a United States representative from New York, serving one term from 1859 to 1861.

== Early life ==
John H. Reynolds was born in Moreau, New York on June 21, 1819, the fourth child of Luthena (Potter) Reynolds farmer and lumberman George Reynolds. He attended the public schools of Sandy Hill, New York (now Hudson Falls) and Bennington, Vermont. Reynolds engaged in civil engineering and took part in the construction of the Saratoga and Whitehall Railroad and Boston and Albany Railroad. He then returned to school at the Kinderhook Academy, from which he graduated in 1840. Reynolds studied law with attorney William H. Tobey of Kinderhook, was admitted to the bar, and began to practice as Tobey's partner in 1843.

== Career ==
Reynolds moved to Albany in 1851, where he practiced law in partnership with John V. L. Pruyn. In 1854, he began a partnership with Clark B. Cochrane and Hamilton Harris.

=== Congress ===
Reynolds was a Democrat opposed to the expansion of slavery. During the Bleeding Kansas controversy, Reynolds ran successfully for a seat in the United States House of Representatives as an Anti-Lecompton Democrat. He served in the 36th Congress, March 4, 1859 to March 3, 1861. He was not a candidate for renomination in 1860.

=== Later career ===
After leaving Congress, Reynolds resumed practicing law in Albany. After Cochrane's 1867 death, Reynolds and Harris continued to practice as partners. In 1873, Reynolds was appointed a commissioner of the New York Court of Appeals.

== Death and burial ==
Reynolds died in Kinderhook on September 24, 1875. He was buried at Kinderhook Cemetery in Kinderhook.

== Family ==
In 1843, Reynolds married Margaret Ann Whiting. They were the parents of six children: Charles Whiting: William H. Tobey; George; John H. Jr.; James Adger; and Margaret Whiting.

U.S. House of Representatives
| Preceded by Erastus Corning | Member of the U.S. House of Representatives from New York's 14th congressional district 1859–1861 | Succeeded by Erastus Corning |
