= Edwin Corning =

American businessman and politician (1883–1934)

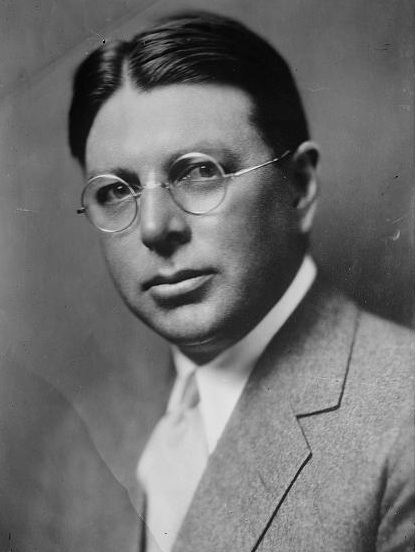

Lieutenant Governor of New York
- In office January 1, 1927 – December 31, 1928
- Governor: Al Smith
- Preceded by: Seymour Lowman
- Succeeded by: Herbert H. Lehman

New York State Democratic Committee chairman
- In office January 1926 – August 1928
- Preceded by: Herbert C. Pell
- Succeeded by: M. William Bray

Personal details
- Born: September 30, 1883 Albany, New York, US
- Died: August 7, 1934 (aged 50) Bar Harbor, Maine, US
- Party: Democratic
- Relations: Parker Corning (brother); Erastus Corning (grandfather); Amasa J. Parker (grandfather)
- Children: Erastus Corning 2nd Louise Corning; Harriet Corning; Edwin Corning Jr.
- Education: Yale University
- Profession: Business executive

Edwin Corning (September 30, 1883 – August 7, 1934) was an American businessman and politician from New York. He was the lieutenant governor of New York from 1927 to 1928.

== Early life ==
Corning was born on September 30, 1883, in Albany, New York. He was a son of Erastus Corning (1827–1897) and Mary (née Parker) Corning (1845–1899). His brother, Parker Corning served as a member of the United States House of Representatives.

Both of his grandfathers, Erastus Corning and Amasa J. Parker, served in Congress, and Parker was also a justice of the New York Supreme Court and founder of Albany Law School.

He was educated at The Albany Academy and the Groton School, and graduated from Yale University in 1906.

== Career ==
After graduating from Yale, Corning served as an executive at the Ludlum Steel Company in Watervliet, New York, and became its president in 1910. He was also an officer of the Albany Felt Company, and served on the board of directors of several Albany banks. Corning was also a gentleman farmer, and bred prize winning horses, sheep and cows. In addition, he was a dog breeder, and became known for his champion Irish wolfhounds.

=== Political career ===
In the years immediately after World War I, Corning collaborated with Daniel P. O'Connell to create a Democratic organization in Albany that could wrest control of the city from the Republican organization run by William Barnes Jr.; their strategy was to run wealthy non-ethnic Protestants like Edwin Corning, William Stormont Hackett, Parker Corning, and Erastus Corning 2nd for major offices including mayor and Congressman to enhance the respectability and credibility of a Democratic organization run by working class Irish-American, Catholic figures like O'Connell. Corning became chairman of the Albany County Democratic Committee in 1912 and chairman of the county committee's executive committee in 1919. In the 1921 contest for mayor, the O'Connell/Corning organization succeeded in electing Hackett, the beginning of Democratic control of city hall that has remained in place ever since.

Corning was chairman of the New York State Democratic Committee from 1926 to 1928. He was Lieutenant Governor of New York from 1927 to 1928, elected on the Democratic ticket with Governor Alfred E. Smith in 1926. In 1928, when Smith planned to run for president, the Albany Democratic organization intended to run Hackett for governor. After Hackett's death in a car accident, Corning considered making the campaign, but declined because of ill health. After his term as lieutenant governor he retired from his business and political interests.

== Personal life ==
On November 25, 1908, he married Louise Maxwell, who was born to American parents in Cawnpore, India, where her father was serving as a missionary. Together, Louise and Edwin were the parents of:

- Erastus Corning 2nd (1909–1983), who served as Mayor of Albany for over 40 years.
- Louise Corning (1911–1954), who married Andrew Hamilton Ransom.
- Harriet Corning (1916–1966), who married Wharton Sinkle Jr. (1914–1953) in 1937. She later married Samuel E. Ewing.
- Edwin Corning Jr. (1919–1964), who was serving in the New York State Assembly when he was involved in a 1959 car accident. He resigned his Assembly seat, and died without recovering fully.

Corning died at a hospital in Bar Harbor, Maine during a second leg amputation that was necessary because of gangrene derived from diabetes. He was buried at Albany Rural Cemetery in Menands, New York.

Party political offices
Preceded by Herbert C. Pell	New York State Democratic Committee Chairman; January 1926 – August 1928	Succeeded by M. William Bray
Preceded by George R. Lunn	Democratic nominee for Lieutenant Governor of New York; 1926	Succeeded by Herbert H. Lehman
Political offices
Preceded by Seymour Lowman	Lieutenant Governor of New York; January 1, 1927 – December 31, 1928	Succeeded by Herbert H. Lehman
