= Seymour Lowman =

American politician (1868–1940)

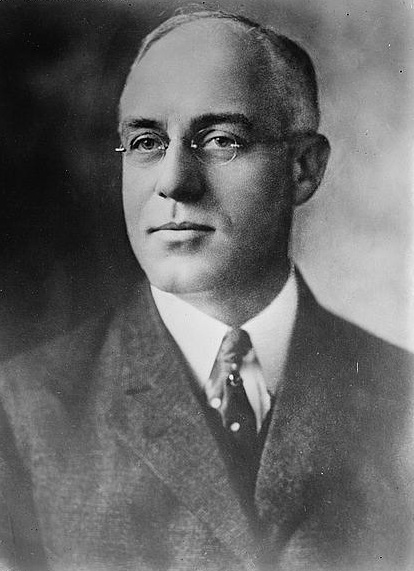

Assistant Secretary of the Treasury in charge of Prohibition enforcement
- In office August 1, 1927 – 15 March 1933
- President: Calvin Coolidge; Herbert Hoover
- Preceded by: Lincoln Clark Andrews
- Succeeded by: office abolished

Lieutenant Governor of New York
- In office January 1, 1925 – December 31, 1926
- Governor: Al Smith
- Preceded by: George R. Lunn
- Succeeded by: Edwin Corning

Member of the New York Senate from the 41st district
- In office January 1, 1919 – December 31, 1924
- Preceded by: Morris S. Halliday
- Succeeded by: James S. Truman

Personal details
- Born: October 7, 1868
- Died: March 13, 1940 (aged 71)
- Spouse: Katherine Smith

Seymour Lowman (October 7, 1868 – March 13, 1940) was an American lawyer and politician from the state of New York. He was also the lieutenant governor of New York from 1925 to 1926.

== Life ==
Seymor Lowman was born in Chemung, New York on October 7, 1868, the son of John Lowman (1832–1884) and Fanny (Bixby) Lowman. He was raised in Bainbridge, and completed his high school education at Bainbridge Union School. He then graduated from Lowell's Business College in Binghamton, and became a school teacher. He studied law with attorney John W. Church of Norwich, was admitted to the bar in 1891, and practiced in Elmira. On September 9, 1893, he married Katherine Harding Smith, whom he had known while growing up in Bainbridge.

Lowman became active in local politics as a supporter of the campaigns of Jacob Sloat Fassett. He was a member of the New York State Assembly (Chemung Co.) in 1909 and 1910, and also Chairman of the Chemung County Republican Committee from 1912 to 1934. He was a member of the New York State Senate (41st D.) from 1919 to 1924, sitting in the 142nd, 143rd, 144th, 145th, 146th and 147th New York State Legislatures, as well as a delegate to the 1924 and 1932 Republican National Conventions.

He was Lieutenant Governor of New York from 1925 to 1926, elected at the New York state election, 1924 on the Republican ticket. At the same time, Democratic Governor Al Smith was re-elected, while his running mate George R. Lunn was defeated. Lowman was the last lieutenant governor of New York who was not the running mate of the elected governor. At the New York state election, 1926, he was defeated for re-election when Al Smith was re-elected with his running mate Edwin Corning.

From August 1, 1927, until the end of the Hoover administration in 1933, Seymor Lowman was Assistant U.S. Secretary of the Treasury under Andrew W. Mellon and Ogden L. Mills, and as a well-known "dry" (against the sale and consumption of alcoholic beverages) was in charge of the enforcement of Prohibition. A month after taking office, he stated: "There are many incompetent and crooked men in the service. Bribery is rampant. There are many wolves in sheep's clothing. We are after them... Some days my arm gets tired signing orders of dismissal."

After leaving office Lowman served as president of the Elmira Savings Bank.

Lowman died in Elmira on March 13, 1940. He was buried at Riverside Cemetery in Chemung.

== Sources ==
- The tariff imbroglio with France, in TIME Magazine on October 17, 1927
- TIME Magazine on July 25, 1927

Party political offices
Preceded by William J. Donovan	Republican nominee for Lieutenant Governor of New York; 1924, 1926	Succeeded by Charles C. Lockwood
New York State Assembly
Preceded by David C. Robinson	New York State Assembly; Chemung County; 1909–1910	Succeeded by Robert P. Bush
New York State Senate
Preceded by Morris S. Halliday	New York State Senate; 41st District; 1919–1924	Succeeded by James S. Truman
Political offices
Preceded by George R. Lunn	Lieutenant Governor of New York; 1925–1926	Succeeded by Edwin Corning
