= Amasa J. Parker =

American judge

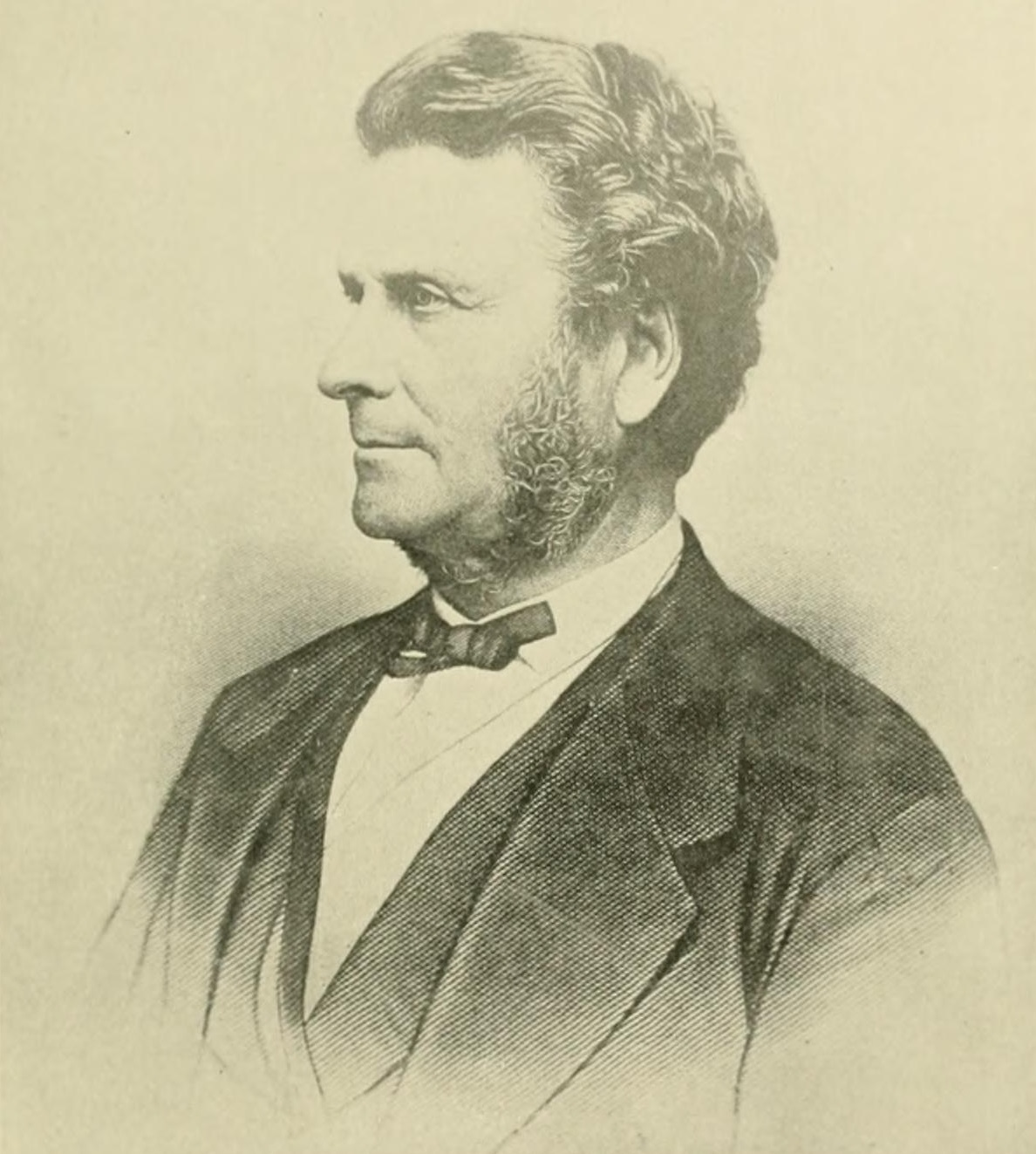
- From 1897's Delaware County, New York; History of the Century, 1797–1897

Member of the U.S. House of Representatives from New York's 20th district
- In office March 4, 1837 – March 3, 1839
- Preceded by: William Seymour
- Succeeded by: Judson Allen

Justice of the New York Supreme Court's Third District
- In office June 7, 1847 – December 31, 1855 Serving with William B. Wright; Ira Harris; Malbone Watson
- Preceded by: None (Position created)
- Succeeded by: George Gould

Judge of New York State's Third Circuit Court
- In office March 6, 1844 – June 6, 1847
- Preceded by: John P. Cushman
- Succeeded by: None (Position abolished)

Member of the Board of Regents for the University of the State of New York
- In office January 20, 1835 – May 4, 1844
- Preceded by: Simeon De Witt
- Succeeded by: James S. Wadsworth

Member of the New York State Assembly from Delaware County
- In office January 1, 1834 – December 31, 1834 Serving with Samuel Gordon
- Preceded by: John Edgerton; Stoddard Stevens
- Succeeded by: Dubois Burhans; William B. Ogden

District Attorney of Delaware County, New York
- In office 1833–1836
- Preceded by: Noadiah Johnson
- Succeeded by: Samuel Gordon

Personal details
- Born: Amasa Junius Parker; June 2, 1807 Sharon, Connecticut
- Died: May 13, 1890 (aged 82) Albany, New York
- Resting place: Albany Rural Cemetery, Menands, New York
- Spouse: Harriet Langdon Roberts (m. 1834)
- Education: Union College, Schenectady, New York
- Occupation: Attorney

Amasa Junius Parker (June 2, 1807 – May 13, 1890) was a 19th-century American attorney, politician and judge from New York. He is most notable for his service as a member of the New York State Assembly (1834), a U.S. Representative (1837–1839), and a justice of the New York Supreme Court (1847–1855).

== Early life ==
Amasa Junius Parker was born in Sharon, Connecticut on June 2, 1807, the son of Anna (née Fenn) and Rev. Daniel Parker. His father was a Congregational clergyman, and also a teacher in Greenville, New York, and elsewhere. Parker's family moved to Hudson, New York, in 1816, where he was instructed by his father and several private tutors. At age 16 in 1823, he was hired as a teacher and principal of Hudson's academy, where he worked until 1827. In 1825, Parker underwent a comprehensive examination at Union College which covered the curriculum of the school's entire four-year program. He passed easily, and received his degree as a member of that year's graduating class. In 1827, he began the study of law with attorney John W. Edmonds. He completed his studies in the Delhi office of his uncle Amasa Parker, was admitted to the bar in 1828, and commenced practice in partnership with his uncle.

== Start of career ==
Parker grew a law practice that expanded to cover several counties adjacent to Delhi, and frequently appeared in both the state circuit and chancery courts. A Democrat, in 1833, he was elected District Attorney of Delaware County, and he served until 1836.

Parker was a member of the New York State Assembly (Delaware Co.) in 1834 (the 57th New York State Legislature). He was elected a regent of the University of the State of New York in 1834, the youngest person ever elected to the board, and he served from 1835 to 1844.

== Congressman ==
Parker was elected to the 25th United States Congress as the representative from Delaware and Broome counties, and served from March 4, 1837, to March 3, 1839. A supporter of President Martin Van Buren, initiatives and issues on which Parker worked while in Congress included Van Buren's unsuccessful Independent Treasury bill (which passed in 1840), the Mississippi election case (which resulted in two Democratic House members being supplanted by Whigs), the operations of the United States General Land Office and its processes for disposing of public land, and the House's response to the duel between Jonathan Cilley and William J. Graves, which ended in Cilley's death. After leaving Congress, Parker resumed the practice of law. In 1839, he was a candidate for the New York State Senate, and lost a close race to Erastus Root.

== Judge ==
=== Circuit court ===
In 1844, Parker moved to Albany, New York to accept appointment as judge of the New York State Circuit Courts' Third Circuit, a post he held until the circuit courts were abolished in 1847. Parker presided at the 1845 trial of Smith A. Boughton ("Big Thunder"), a leader of the tenants during the Anti-Rent War. Parker declared a mistrial, and the retrial was heard by John W. Edmonds. the second trial resulted in a conviction, and Boughton receiving a life sentence, which was later commuted by Governor John Young, who had been elected with the support of the tenants.

=== State supreme court ===
Parker was elected to the New York Supreme Court (Third district) in 1847, and he served until 1855. In 1854, he was one of the ex officio judges of the New York Court of Appeals. Among his cases on the Court of Appeals was Snedeker v. Warring, a landmark case in the field of fixtures law. The central question was whether a large, ornamental statue on a country estate should be considered real property or personal property. Parker's opinion concluded that the statue was real property, and was sustained by a vote of 5 to 2.

The Whig Party had disintegrated by 1855, and when Parker ran for reelection, he was opposed by a candidate of the new Republican Party, George Gould, and Ambrose Z. Jordan, the candidate of the short-lived Know Nothing Party. Gould narrowly defeated Parker, who left the bench at the end of his term.

== Later career ==
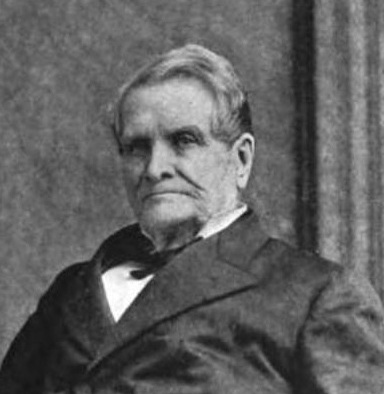
Parker as depicted in Volume 3 (1911) of Legal and Judicial History of New York

After leaving the bench, Parker resumed practicing law in Albany, and founded a partnership that included former judge Edwin Countryman and Parker's son Amasa J. Parker Jr. Among his well known cases was his successful argument to the United States Supreme Court that national banks were subject to state taxation.

Parker was one of the founders of the Albany (New York) Law School in 1851, and he was a member of the school's faculty for over twenty years. He was the unsuccessful Democratic candidate for Governor of New York twice, losing to Republicans John Alsop King in 1856 and Edwin D. Morgan in 1858. During the administrations of New York's Democratic governors, Parker declined several offers to reappoint him to the bench, and during the presidential administration of James Buchanan he declined appointment as United States Attorney for the Southern District of New York.

During the period before the American Civil War, Parker remained loyal to the Democratic Party and advocated a moderate course in the hope that concessions on the slavery issue would avoid bloodshed. In 1861, he was the permanent chairman of the state Democratic convention. Once the war started, he supported the Union, but argued against what he saw as the excesses of the Lincoln administration. In 1864, he successfully argued the case of Palin v. Murray in Greene County, obtaining a judgment for the plaintiff on the grounds of false imprisonment by federal authorities. The case was later moved to the federal courts, where it was decided in Palin's favor by the U.S. Supreme Court in 1869.

In 1867, Parker was a delegate to the New York State Constitutional Convention of 1867. He was heavily involved in committees that considered reorganization of the state courts, and successfully advocated abolition of the chancery courts, and the vesting of both law and equity powers in the same courts. In 1868, Parker took on a rare criminal defense case and obtained an acquittal for George W. Cole on the grounds of temporary insanity after Cole shot and killed L. Harris Hiscock. In the early 1870s, Parker declined the large retainer offered to defend William Tweed during Tweed's trials for corruption. In his later years, Parker compiled, edited and published six volumes of reports on criminal cases, and took part with several colleagues in publishing a revised edition of New York's state statutes.

Parker was a longtime promoter of higher education, and served as a trustee or board of governors member of several institutions, including Union College, Cornell University, Albany Medical College, and the Albany Female Academy. While serving in the Assembly in 1834, Parker advocated the creation of a state hospital for the insane. When the facility was finally established as the Hudson River State Hospital in the 1860s, Parker was appointed to its board of trustees, and he served until 1881.

=== Harmanus Bleecker Library ===
When Harmanus Bleecker died in 1848, he left his estate to his much younger wife with the stipulation that, upon her death, the money would be spent to benefit the city of Albany. She survived him by almost 40 years, and the executor of her estate decided the $130,000 (4.66 million in modern dollars) would best be spent to benefit the Young Men's Association, an organization Bleecker had strongly supported, including service on its board of directors. Under the terms of Bleecker's will, Parker and John V. L. Pruyn were involved in disposing of his estate, which resulted in construction of Harmanus Bleecker Hall, a library and theater complex, which was built in 1889. In 1919, the board of the Young Men's Association decided it would be better off with a structure dedicated purely for use as a library. It sold the hall and used the proceeds to build Harmanus Bleecker Library. The association deeded the library building to the city in 1924. It was the first library building in the city, and the beginning of Albany's current public library system. The library later relocated to other facilities, and the Bleecker library building was eventually redeveloped as commercial office space.

== Death and burial ==
Parker continued to practice law into his old age, and argued a case before the state Court of Appeals the week before his death. He died in Albany on May 13, 1890. He was buried at Albany Rural Cemetery, Section 54, Lot 8.

== Honors ==
In 1846, Parker received the honorary degree of LL.D. from Geneva College.

== Family ==
On August 27, 1834, Parker married Harriet Langdon Roberts, a daughter of Edmund Roberts and granddaughter of Woodbury Langdon. Among their children were: Amasa J. Parker Jr.; Mary Parker, who married Erastus Corning (1827–1897) and was the mother of Edwin Corning and Parker Corning and grandmother of Erastus Corning 2nd and Edwin Corning Jr.; Anna Fenn Parker (1840–1909), the second wife of John V. L. Pruyn; and Katharine Langdon Parker, the wife of New York Militia General Selden E. Marvin.

== Works ==
- An address delivered before the graduating class of the Albany Medical College (1860)

== Sources ==
=== Books ===
- Howell, George Rogers; Tenney, Jonathan (1886). Bi-centennial History of Albany. New York, NY: W. W. Munsell & Co.
- Murray, David (1897). Delaware County, New York; History of the Century, 1797–1897. Delhi, NY: W. Clark.
- Wilson, J. G.; Fiske, J., eds. (1900). "Parker, Amasa Junius" . Appletons' Cyclopædia of American Biography. New York: D. Appleton.
- Young Men's Association for Mutual Improvement (1888). Sketch of the Lives of Harmanus Bleecker and Sebastiana Cornelia Coster; With a History of the Gift of the "Bleecker Fund" to the Young Men's Association. Albany, NY: Weed, Parsons & Company.

=== Newspapers ===
- "Obituary: Ex-Judge Amasa J. Parker". New-York Daily Tribune. Albany (published May 14, 1890). May 13, 1890 – via Newspapers.com.

=== Internet ===
- Lee Pinckney III and John A. Bonafide (October 1995). "National Register of Historic Places Registration: Harmanus Bleecker Library". New York State Office of Parks, Recreation and Historic Preservation. Archived from the original on December 10, 2011.
- Albany Rural Cemetery (May 16, 1890). "Albany Rural Cemetery Burial Cards, 1791–2011, Entry for Amasa J. Parker". Ancestry.com. Lehi, UT: Ancestry.com LLC.

Party political offices
Preceded by Horatio Seymour	Democratic nominee for Governor of New York; 1856, 1858	Succeeded by William Kelly
U.S. House of Representatives
Preceded by William Seymour	Member of the U.S. House of Representatives from New York's 20th congressional district 1837–1839	Succeeded by Judson Allen
