= George R. Lunn =

American politician (1873–1948)

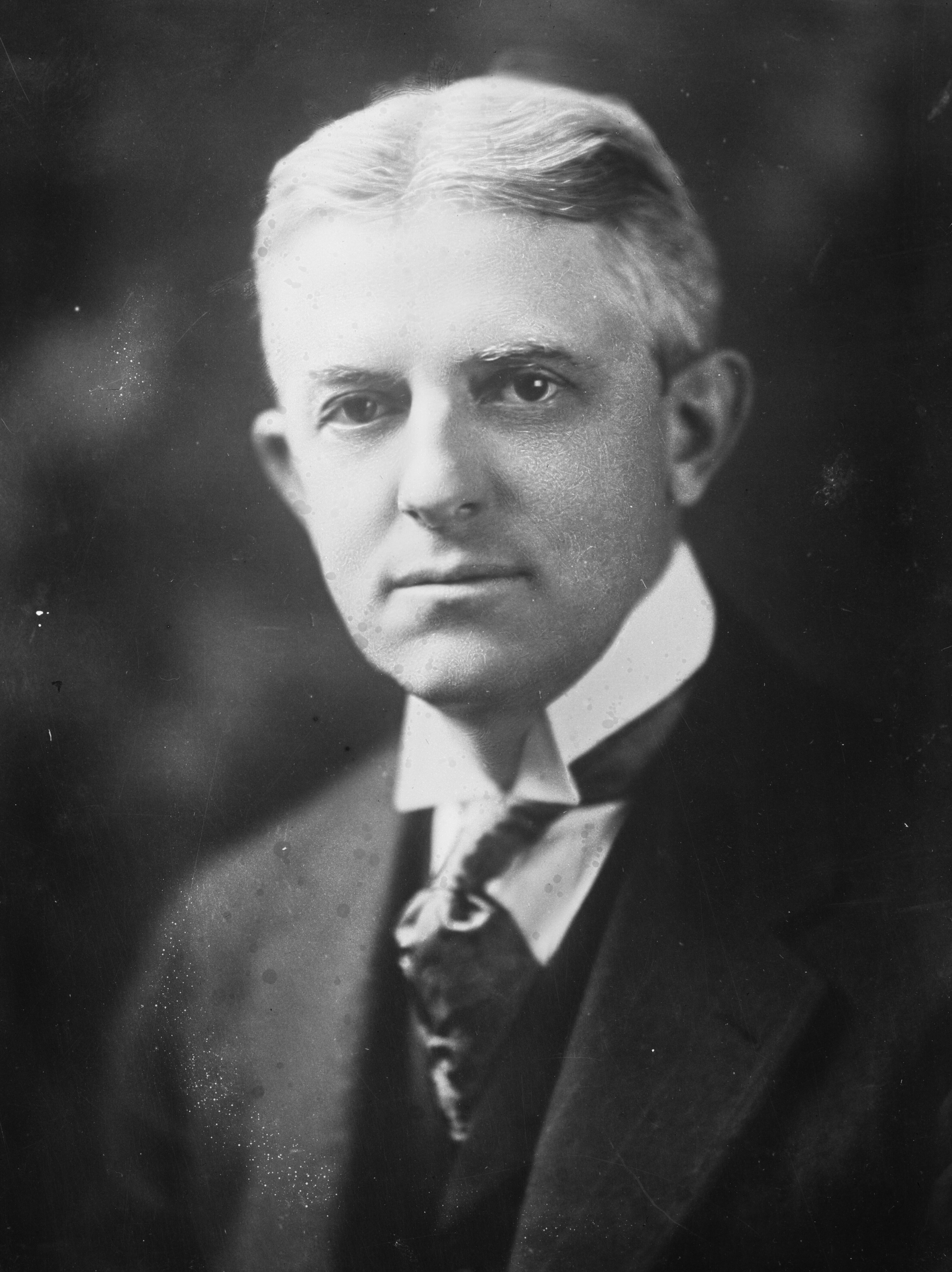
- Lunn in 1920

Lieutenant Governor of New York
- In office January 1, 1923 – December 31, 1924
- Governor: Al Smith
- Preceded by: Clayton R. Lusk (acting)
- Succeeded by: Seymour Lowman

Member of the U.S. House of Representatives from New York’s 30th district
- In office March 4, 1917 – March 3, 1919
- Preceded by: William B. Charles
- Succeeded by: Frank Crowther

Mayor of Schenectady
- In office March 4, 1919 – January 1, 1923
- Preceded by: Charles A. Simon
- Succeeded by: Clarence A. Whitmire
- In office January 1, 1916 – March 3, 1917
- Preceded by: J. Teller Schoolcraft
- Succeeded by: Charles A. Simon
- In office January 1, 1912 – December 31, 1913
- Preceded by: Charles C. Duryee
- Succeeded by: J. Teller Schoolcraft

Personal details
- Born: George Richard Lunn; June 23, 1873 Lenox, Iowa, U.S.
- Died: November 27, 1948 (aged 75) Del Mar, California, U.S.
- Party: Socialist (before 1916); Democratic (after 1916)

Military service
- Branch/service: United States Army
- Years of service: 1898
- Rank: Corporal
- Unit: 3rd Nebraska Volunteer Infantry Regiment
- Battles/wars: Spanish–American War

George Richard Lunn (June 23, 1873 – November 27, 1948) was an American Spanish-American War veteran, clergyman and politician from New York. He was the first Socialist mayor in the state of New York, a U.S. Representative from 1917 to 1919, and the lieutenant governor of New York from 1923 to 1924.

== Early years ==
George R. Lunn was born June 23, 1873, on a farm located near the small town of Lenox, Iowa. His parents, Martin Adolphus Lunn and the former Martha Bratton, reared 6 surviving children, four boys and two girls, with three others dying in infancy.

The son and grandson of farmers, Lunn was raised in a conservative religious household which strictly observed the Sabbath and regarded the playing of musical instruments in church to be an unacceptable nod to secularity. The family relocated to the city of Des Moines when George was just a boy, and he quit school at the age of 12 to work there as a paperboy.

At the age of 17 Lunn left home and briefly relocated to Council Bluffs, Iowa. He then made his way further west to Omaha, Nebraska, where he worked as the driver of a delivery wagon. As a teenager, Lunn decided to enter the Christian ministry and he began three years of preparatory educational work to make up the high school education that he lacked.

He was accepted to Bellevue College in Bellevue, Nebraska, enrolling in the fall of 1892 and graduating in 1897. In 1893 the 20-year old Lunn was approached by the congregation of a small church in La Platte, Nebraska, located five miles south of Bellevue, and was asked to become their pastor. Although he had never preached before, church parishioners were not aware of this fact and Lunn accepted the position. He retained the position for several years, paid out of the church's weekly collections.

=== Spanish-American War ===
Lunn was anxious to attend the Princeton Theological Seminary and in the fall of 1897 he enrolled there. However, near the end of his first year at Princeton the Spanish–American War erupted. He returned home to Omaha to take over a Presbyterian pastorate for the summer. He subsequently joined the United States Army for the Spanish–American War, enlisting in Company A, 3rd Nebraska Infantry Regiment, a unit of the United States Volunteers, which was commanded by William Jennings Bryan. Lunn attained the rank of corporal, but became ill with typhoid while still in the United States, so he spent most of military service convalescing in Jacksonville, Florida.

=== Return to ministry ===
Following his release from the military, Lunn enrolled at Union Theological Seminary—an institution which he felt was less conservative and constraining than was the Princeton Seminary. He would graduate from Union Theological Seminary in 1901, finally gaining ordination as a Presbyterian minister.

Lunn married in May 1901 and upon graduation was called to be the associate pastor of the Lafayette Avenue Presbyterian Church in Brooklyn. He would remain there until 1904, at which time he was named the pastor of the First Dutch Reformed Church of Schenectady, New York.

== Political career ==
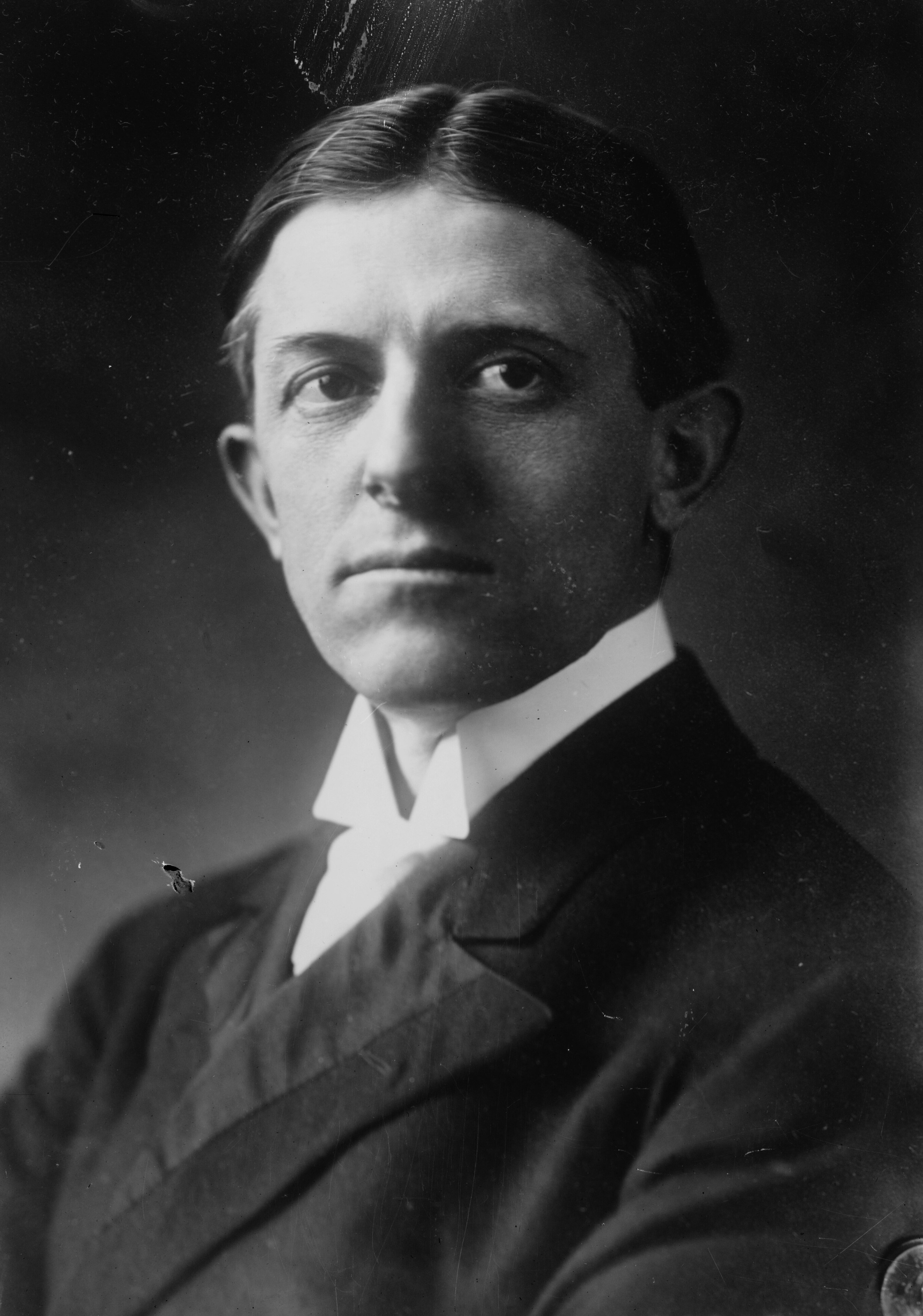
Lunn c. 1910s

Closely concerned with matters of ethics and poverty, Lunn became a Christian socialist, testifying the social gospel from the pulpit. Seeking to eliminate suffering through structural change, Lunn joined the Socialist Party of America and in 1911 he was elected Mayor of Schenectady at the head of the local Socialist ticket. His term was marked by a commitment to expansion of the city's parks and playgrounds, establishment of city health centers, and improvements in the local system of public schools and in garbage collections—the classic range of practical programmatic interests later known as sewer socialism.

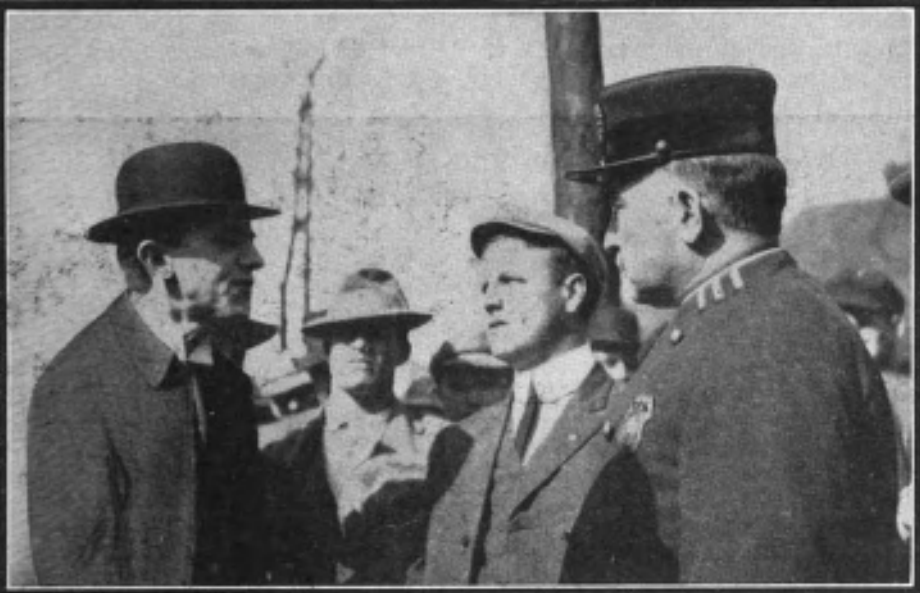
Lunn (left) moments before his arrest during the 1912 Little Falls textile strike

During his first term of office, Lunn was invited to speak in support of a strike then in progress in the town of Little Falls, New York. He accepted the offer but was denied permission to speak by city officials in a public park. Lunn nevertheless attempted to speak, reading from Abraham Lincoln's Gettysburg Address and wound up as one of four people arrested on charges of "inciting to riot"—charges later dropped when the tension of the situation lessened.

Lunn's first term ran from 1911 to 1913 and he was returned to office for a second two-year term in 1915, again on the ticket of the Socialist Party. During his second term of office, Lunn was approached by officials of the Democratic Party and invited to switch parties for a run for United States Congress.

=== Congress ===
He was elected as a Democrat to the 65th United States Congress, and served from March 4, 1917, to March 3, 1919. In 1920, he was defeated by Harry C. Walker in the Democratic primary for U.S. Senator from New York.

=== Later political career ===
From 1919 to 1923 he served again as Schenectady's Mayor. He was a Delegate to the Democratic National Conventions in 1920, 1924, 1928, 1932, and 1936.

Lunn was Lieutenant Governor of New York from 1923 to 1924, elected on the Democratic ticket in 1922, but defeated for re-election in 1924, even as Democratic Governor Alfred E. Smith was winning reelection. The 1924 election was the last in which the Governor and Lieutenant Governor were elected on different tickets.

In 1925, Lunn was appointed to the New York Public Service Commission, and he served until 1942.

In 1928, Lunn was approached by New York Democrats to run for Governor after the presumptive nominee, William Stormont Hackett, died suddenly. Lunn declined, and the nomination eventually went to former assistant Navy Secretary Franklin D. Roosevelt.

Lunn served as Commander-in-Chief of the United Spanish War Veterans from 1931 to 1932.

== Death and burial ==
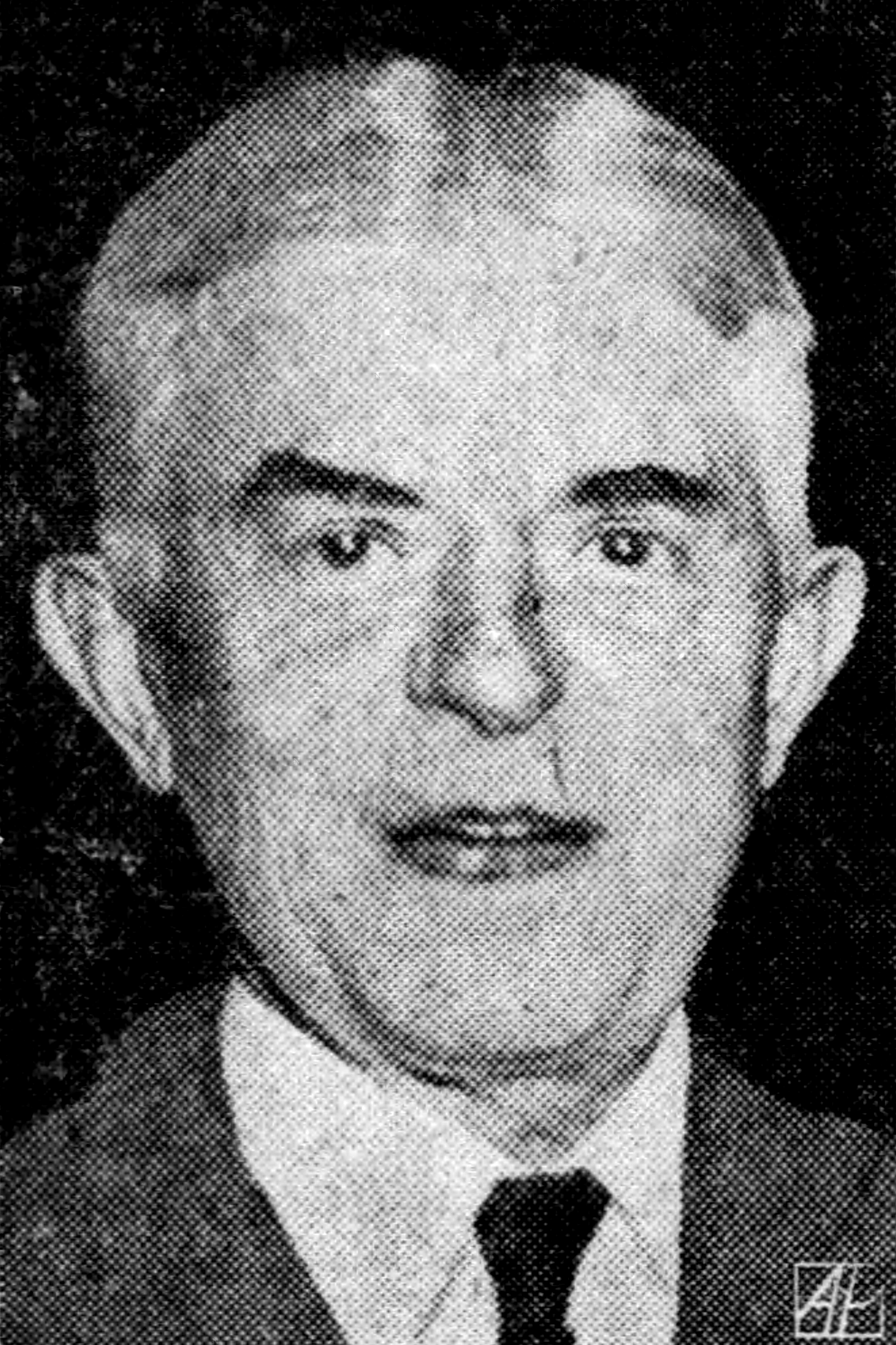
Lunn later in life

Lunn retired to Del Mar, California, where he died on November 27, 1948. He was buried at Forest Lawn Memorial Park in Glendale, California. Together with his first wife, the former Mabel Healy of Brooklyn, Lunn raised a total of 5 children. Made a widower in 1931, Lunn remarried in 1932, wedding Anita Oliver Jensen of California.

== Works ==
- "Testimony to the Special Investigative Committee of the New York State Assembly, Jan. 28, 1920." Corvallis, Ore.: 1000 Flowers Publishing, 2012.

== See also ==
- List of elected socialist mayors in the United States

Party political offices
Preceded by George R. Fitts	Democratic nominee for Lieutenant Governor of New York; 1922, 1924	Succeeded by Edwin Corning
U.S. House of Representatives
Preceded by William B. Charles	Member of the U.S. House of Representatives from New York's 30th congressional district 1917–1919	Succeeded by Frank Crowther
Political offices
Preceded by Clayton R. Lusk; Acting	Lieutenant Governor of New York; 1923–1924	Succeeded by Seymour Lowman
