= 1926 New York state election =

1926 New York gubernatorial election
- November 2, 1926

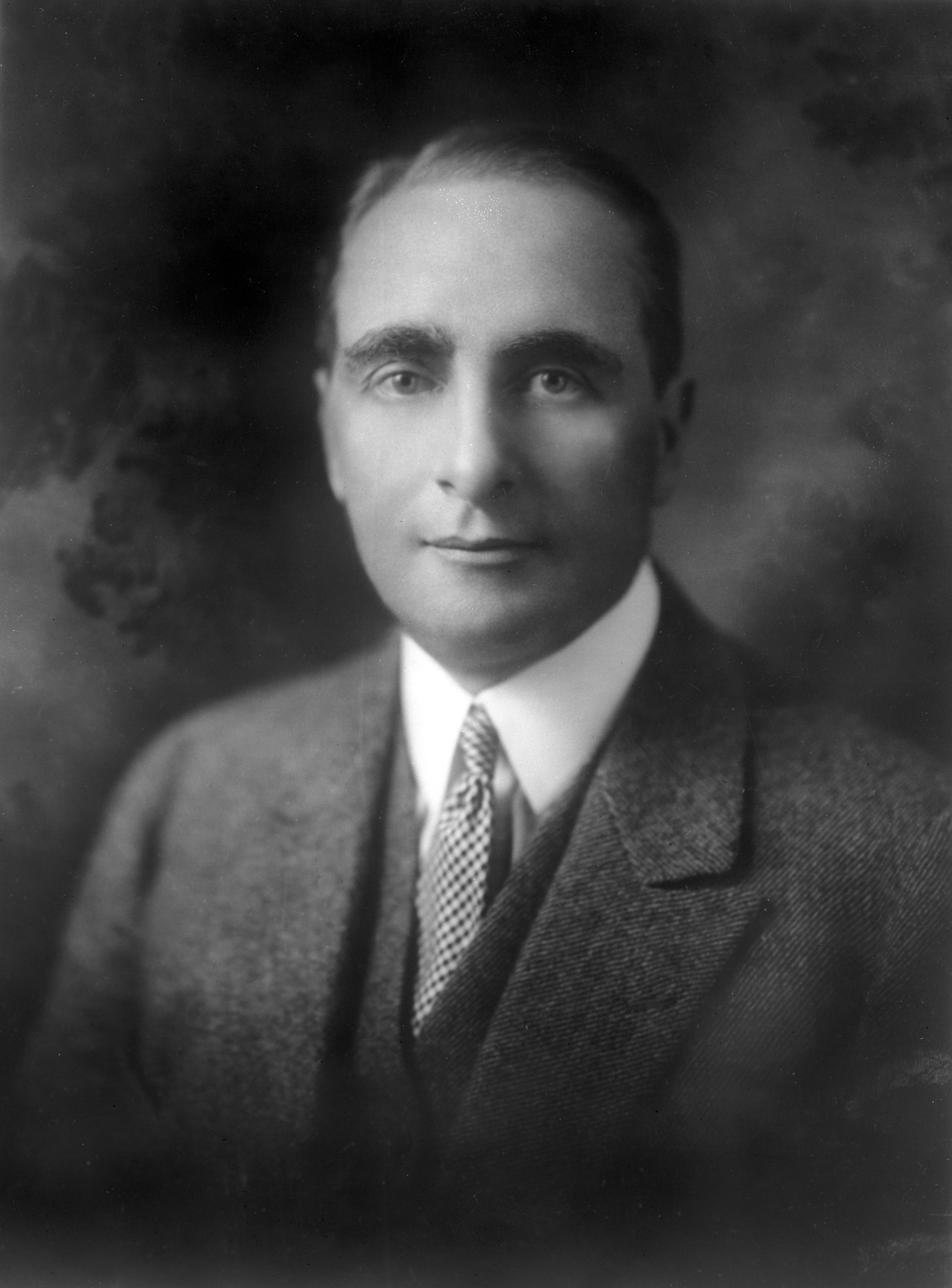
Nominee	Al Smith	Ogden L. Mills
Party	Democratic	Republican
Popular vote	1,523,813	1,276,137
Percentage	53.30%	43.80%
- County results Smith: 40–50% 50–60% 60–70% 70–80% Mills: 40–50% 50–60% 60–70% 70–80%
Governor before election
Al Smith
Democratic
Elected Governor
Al Smith
Democratic

The 1926 New York state election was held on November 2, 1926, to elect the governor, the lieutenant governor, the state comptroller, the attorney general, a U.S. senator, the chief judge and an associate judge of the New York Court of Appeals, as well as all members of the New York State Assembly and the New York State Senate. A referendum to repeal Prohibition was also proposed and accepted by a very large majority.

== History ==
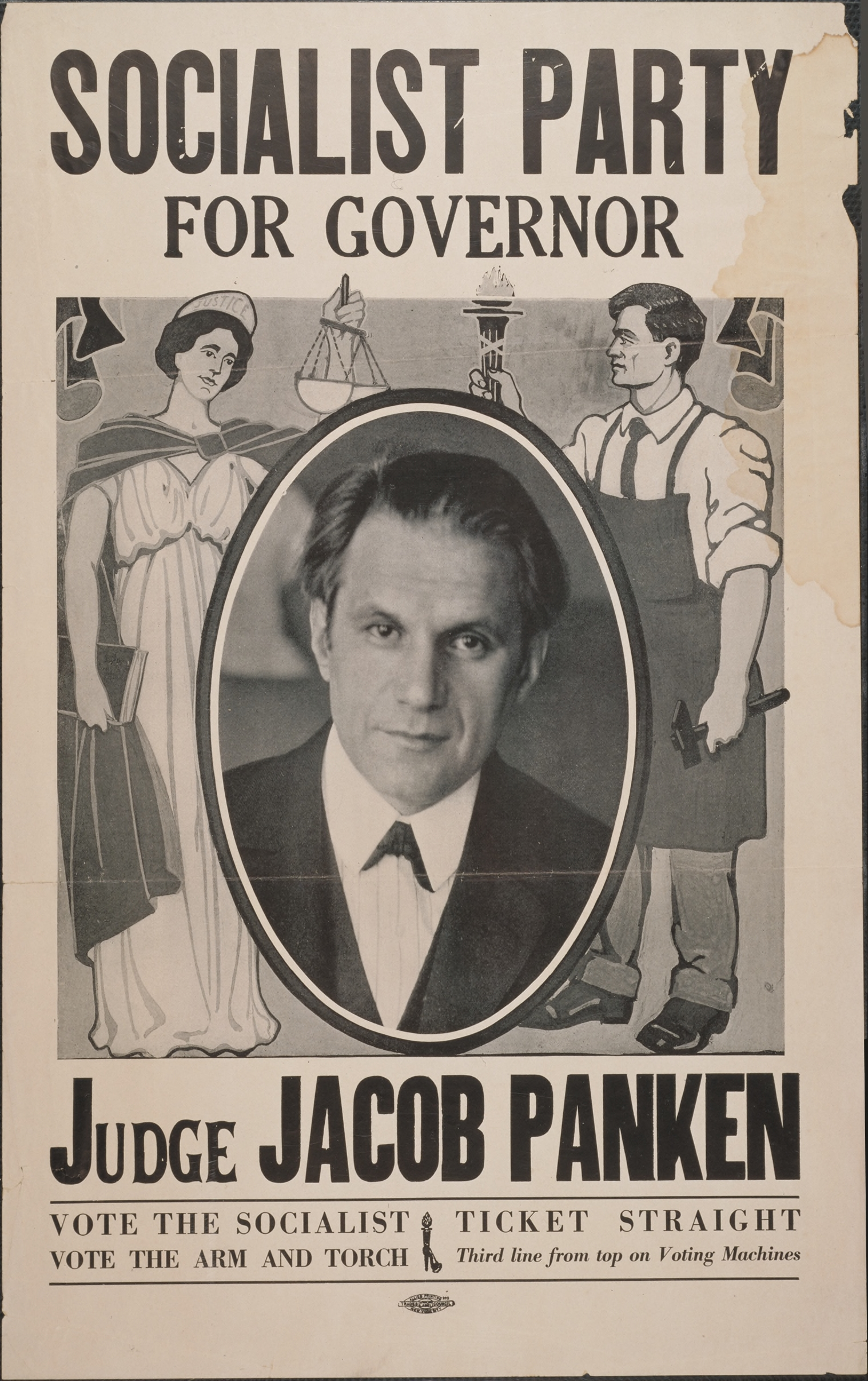
Socialist Party campaign poster featuring Jacob Panken as a candidate for governor

The Prohibition state convention met on June 24 at 150 Fifth Avenue in New York City and nominated Charles E. Manierre for governor. The party had lost its automatic ballot access in 1922, had not run in 1924, and now needed to gather signatures and file a petition to go on the ballot.

The Republican state convention met on September 28 at the Madison Square Garden in New York City, and nominated Ogden L. Mills for governor and re-nominated the incumbent U.S. Senator James W. Wadsworth, Jr.

The Democratic state convention met on September 28 at Syracuse, New York, and re-nominated Governor Al Smith.

== Result ==
Almost the whole Democratic ticket was elected, only the Republican incumbent Attorney General Ottinger managed to stay in office.

The incumbents Smith and Ottinger were re-elected. The incumbents Lowman, Murphy and Wadsworth were defeated.

The Democratic, Republican and Socialist parties maintained automatic ballot access (necessary 25,000 votes for governor), the Prohibition and Socialist Labor Party did not re-attain it, and the Workers Party did not attain it.

1926 state election results
Office	Democratic ticket		Republican ticket		Independent Republican ticket		Socialist ticket		Prohibition ticket		Workers ticket		Socialist Labor ticket	
Governor	Alfred E. Smith	1,523,813	Ogden L. Mills	1,276,137			Jacob Panken	83,481	Charles E. Manierre	21,285	Benjamin Gitlow	5,507	Jeremiah D. Crowley	3,553
Lieutenant Governor	Edwin Corning	1,398,856	Seymour Lowman	1,300,562			August Claessens	86,844	Ella L. McCarthy	17,303	Franklin P. Brill	6,506	John E. DeLee	4,587
Comptroller	Morris S. Tremaine	1,367,393	Vincent B. Murphy	1,294,251			Charles W. Noonan	85,493	Neil D. Cranmer	26,308	Juliet S. Poyntz	6,633	Lewis F. Alrutz	4,848
Attorney General	Benjamin Stolz	1,342,627	Albert Ottinger	1,328,062			Hezekiah D. Wilcox	81,800	David A. Howell	21,472	Belle Robbins	7,010	Simeon Bickwheat	4,372
Chief Judge	Benjamin N. Cardozo	2,590,356	Benjamin N. Cardozo				Darwin J. Meserole	99,367					Milton Weinberger	14,088
Judge of the Court of Appeals	Henry T. Kellogg	2,599,190	Henry T. Kellogg				William Karlin	100,412						
U.S. Senator	Robert F. Wagner	1,321,463	James W. Wadsworth, Jr.	1,205,246	Franklin W. Cristman	231,906	Jessie W. Hughan	73,412	(none)		William F. Dunne	6,444	Joseph Brandon	4,342

== See also ==
- New York gubernatorial elections
- New York state elections

== Sources ==
- Result (Prohibition only): Vote for Prohibition candidates at Prohibitionists.org
- Results NYT OFFICIAL PLURALITY FOR SMITH 247,478 (Subscription required)

Vote totals-New York Red Book 1927
