= Erastus Corning 2nd =

American politician (1909–1983)

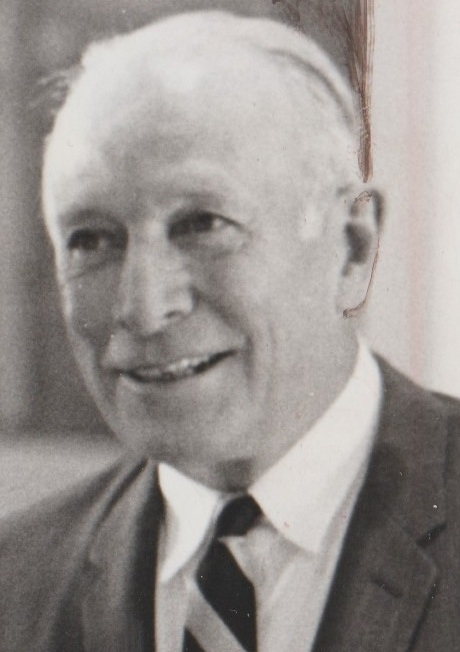
- Mayor Corning in 1969

72nd Mayor of Albany, New York
- In office January 2, 1942 – May 28, 1983
- Preceded by: J. Boyd Thatcher II
- Succeeded by: Thomas M. Whalen III

Member of the New York Senate from the 30th district
- In office January 1, 1937 – August 1, 1941
- Preceded by: William T. Byrne
- Succeeded by: Julian B. Erway

Member of the New York State Assembly from Albany's 1st district
- In office January 1, 1936 – December 31, 1936
- Preceded by: John H. Cahill
- Succeeded by: George W. Foy

Personal details
- Born: October 7, 1909 Albany, New York, US
- Died: May 28, 1983 (aged 73) Boston, Massachusetts, US
- Resting place: Albany Rural Cemetery, Menands, New York, US
- Party: Democratic
- Spouse: Elizabeth Norris Platt (m. 1932-1983, his death)
- Relations: Erastus Corning (great-grandfather); Amasa J. Parker (great-grandfather); Parker Corning (uncle); Edwin Corning Jr. (brother)
- Children: Erastus Corning III; Bettina Corning Dudley
- Parent(s): Edwin Corning; Louise Maxwell
- Education: Yale University
- Profession: Insurance broker
- Civilian awards: Order of Orange-Nassau (Officer)

Military service
- Allegiance: United States
- Branch/service: United States Army
- Years of service: 1944–1945
- Rank: Private First Class
- Unit: 38th Infantry Regiment, 2nd Infantry Division
- Battles/wars: World War II: Ardennes-Alsace; Central Europe
- Military awards: Bronze Star Medal; Combat Infantryman Badge

Erastus Corning 2nd (October 7, 1909 – May 28, 1983) was an American businessman and Democratic Party politician who served as the 72nd mayor of Albany, New York from 1942 to 1983, when Albany County was controlled by one of the last classic urban political machines in the United States.

Corning hailed from a prominent Albany family. His great-grandfather, Erastus Corning, was an industrialist who founded the New York Central Railroad and served in Congress and as Albany's mayor from 1834 to 1837. Another great-grandfather, Amasa J. Parker, was a member of Congress and prominent judge. Corning's father, Edwin Corning, was lieutenant governor of New York from 1927 to 1928. His uncle, Parker Corning, served as a member of the United States House of Representatives. His brother, Edwin Corning Jr., served as a member of the New York State Assembly. Corning was educated at The Albany Academy, Groton School, and Yale University (class of 1932). The Corning family was involved in several Albany-area businesses, and Corning started an insurance agency after his college graduation. While he served as mayor, his agency did not do business with the city of Albany, but did do business with Albany County, which Corning argued presented no conflict of interest, since he was not a county official.

Corning's father was one of the leaders of the Democratic Party organization formed by Daniel P. O'Connell, which wrested control of Albany city and county from the Republican organization led by William Barnes Jr. in the early 1920s. The O'Connell machine proved so durable that it still largely controlled Albany County until the early 1980s, one of the last such organizations to remain viable. Corning entered politics at an early age as an affiliate of the O'Connell organization, winning a seat in the New York State Assembly in 1935. After serving in the Assembly during the 1936 legislative session, Corning won election to the New York State Senate, where he served from 1937 to 1941. Corning was elected mayor in 1941. He continued to win election every four years until 1981, and served from 1941 until his death in 1983. Corning was drafted for World War II and served in the United States Army's 2nd Infantry Division during combat in Europe. In 1946, he was the Democratic Party's unsuccessful nominee for lieutenant governor. In the 1970s, Corning teamed with Governor Nelson A. Rockefeller to finance construction of the Empire State Plaza, a large state government office complex near Albany's downtown area. The plaza's tallest building, Erastus Corning Tower, was named in Corning's honor.

In the early 1980s, Corning's health began to deteriorate. In January 1983, he was moved to University Hospital in Boston, where he died on May 28. Corning was buried at Albany Rural Cemetery in Menands, New York. At over 41 years, Corning's tenure makes him Albany's longest-serving mayor, as well as the longest-tenured mayor ever of any large city in the United States.

== Early life ==
Erastus Corning 2nd was born in Albany, New York, on October 7, 1909, the son of Louise Maxwell and Edwin Corning. Corning's mother was born to American parents in Cawnpore, India, where her father Allan was serving as a missionary. After the 1890 death of Allan Maxwell, her mother Ellen became a successful novelist and married U.S. Navy admiral Albert S. Barker.

Corning's father was from an Albany-area family prominent in business and politics. Corning was educated at The Albany Academy and Groton School. In 1928, he began attendance at Yale University. Corning graduated magna cum laude with a Bachelor of Arts degree in 1932 and was a member of the Chi Psi fraternity, Wolf's Head senior society, and Phi Beta Kappa academic honor society.

== Early career ==
After graduating from college, Corning started the Albany Associates insurance company and soon entered politics. Albany Associates profited from being the sole bidder on Albany County insurance contracts for many years. Corning defended this apparent conflict of interest by noting that he was a city official, but did not hold county office.

Corning was a member of the New York State Assembly (Albany Co., 1st D.) in 1936; and of the New York State Senate (30th D.) from 1937 to 1941, sitting in the 160th, 161st, 162nd and 163rd New York State Legislatures. He resigned his seat on August 1, 1941, to seek the Democratic nomination for mayor of Albany.

Corning won the first of his 11 terms as mayor in November 1941, easily defeating the Republican candidate, Benjamin R. Hoff, by nearly 46,000 votes. Corning took office on January 1, 1942. Shortly after his first term began, the newly elected Governor Thomas E. Dewey had the powerful Albany Democratic political machine, run by "Boss" Daniel P. O'Connell, investigated. The investigations proved largely unsuccessful and left Corning and O'Connell unscathed. The O'Connell machine proved to be one of the most durable in American history, even outlasting the Daley family machine in Chicago.

== Military service ==
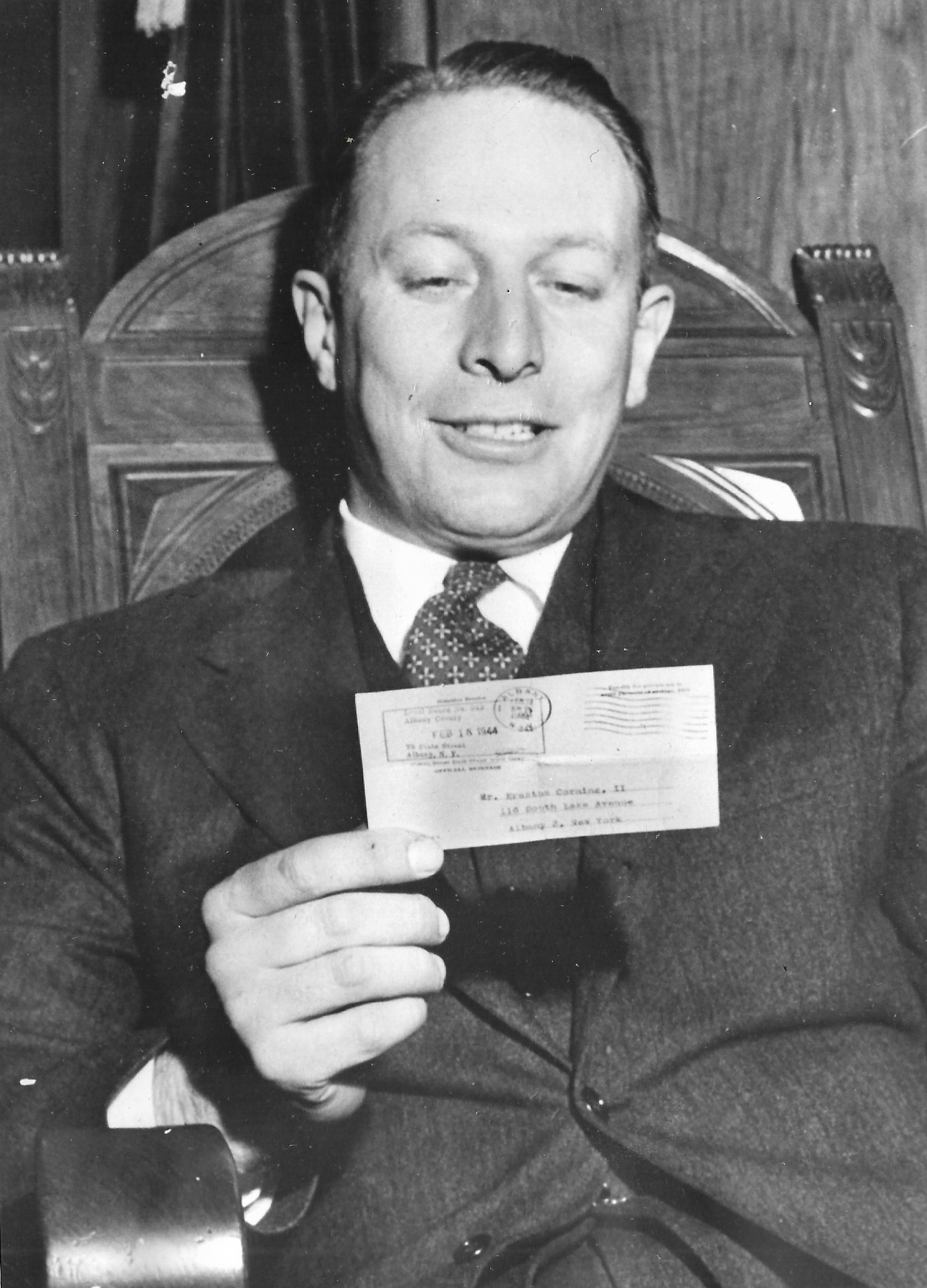
Corning displays his draft notice, February 22, 1944.

After having been previously classified as ineligible for military service during World War II, in 1944, Corning's draft status was changed and he was found eligible. Opting not to apply for an officer's commission or specialty training in a field such as civil affairs, he joined the United States Army as a private. During his absence, Frank Harris, a member of the city council, served as acting mayor.

Corning underwent training as an infantryman at Fort Dix, New Jersey, and Camp Blanding, Florida. Assigned to the 38th Infantry Regiment, a unit of the 2nd Infantry Division, he arrived in France with his unit in October, 1944. In France, Corning was initially attached to an organization that performed rebuilding duties in towns and villages that had been liberated from German occupation. During late 1944 and early 1945, he took part in the Battle of the Bulge and the Western Allied invasion of Germany and attained the rank of private first class.

In the fall of 1945, Corning was discharged and returned to Albany. His awards included the Combat Infantryman Badge, Bronze Star Medal, European-African-Middle Eastern Campaign Medal with two battle stars, World War II Victory Medal, Army Good Conduct Medal, and the Presidential Unit Citation, which was awarded to Corning's battalion.

== Post-World War II career ==
At the New York state election, 1946, Corning ran for lieutenant governor of New York on the ticket with James M. Mead for governor, but they were defeated by the incumbent Republicans Dewey and Joe R. Hanley. Several supporters urged Corning to run for governor in 1950, but he declined. He instead settled into a long mayoral career; he won reelection 10 times, usually by substantial margins.

The most notable exception to Corning's easy reelections was 1973, when a prominent businessman and reform candidate, Carl Touhey, ran a well-financed Republican campaign and came within 3,500 votes of defeating him. In 1977, Corning faced a primary election challenge from State Senator Howard C. Nolan Jr., defeating him by a comfortable margin. Corning's last mayoral re-election came in 1981, when he defeated Charles Touhey, son of Carl Touhey, by a two-to-one margin.

== Personal life ==
Corning referred to himself as "Erastus Corning 2nd", preferring it to "Erastus Corning II" or "Erastus Corning Jr."

In 1932, Corning married Elizabeth Norris Platt (1912–1993). They were the parents of two children, Erastus Corning III and Bettina Corning Dudley.

Corning's extended family was prominent in Albany-area business and politics for several generations. In addition to his father Edwin, who served as lieutenant governor, Corning's family included: Erastus Corning (great-grandfather); Amasa J. Parker (great-grandfather); Parker Corning (uncle); and Edwin Corning Jr. (brother).

Dorothea "Polly" Noonan, a onetime secretary to Corning, a vice chairwoman of the Democratic State Committee, and a longtime president of the Albany Democratic Women's Club was Corning's "closest confidante". According to author Paul Grondahl, the lives of Corning and Noonan were "'inextricably linked through politics and personal devotion'". Author William Kennedy recalled in his book "O Albany!" that at Corning's funeral, members of the media were asked not to "'focus undue attention'" on Noonan. According to The New York Times, Corning, "in effect, disinherited his wife and children. He left the Noonan family his insurance business, which generously sold policies to anyone who wanted to do business with the government".

On May 28, 1983, following a year-long illness, Corning died of cardio-pulmonary failure at University Hospital in Boston. He was buried at Albany Rural Cemetery.

== Legacy ==
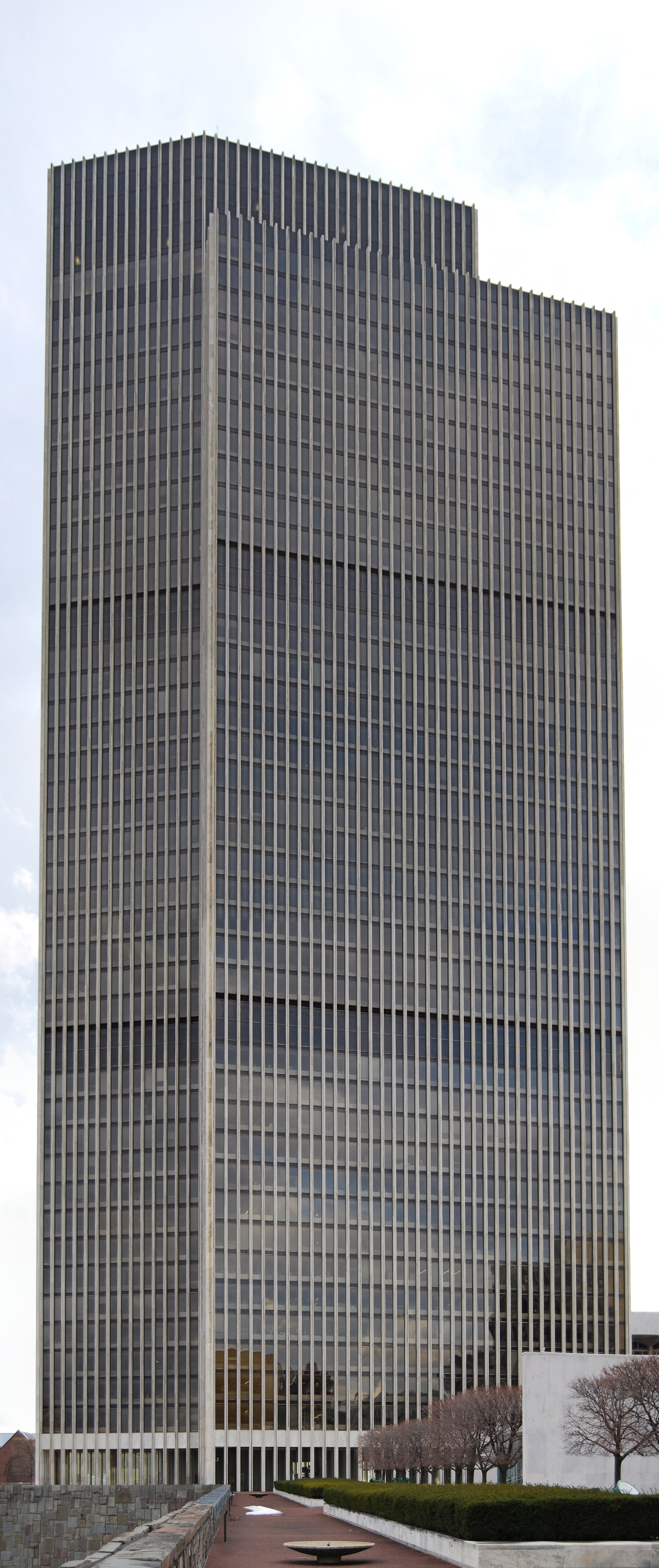
Erastus Corning Tower

The Erastus Corning Tower, the tallest building in Albany and the tallest in the state outside New York City, is named for him, as is the Corning Preserve, a nature trail and fishing site on the western banks of the Hudson River in Albany. The tower is part of the Empire State Plaza, a 98-acre (400,000 m^{2}), 11-building state government office and cultural complex. Completed in 1973, the skyscraper was dedicated to Corning upon his death in 1983. Corning worked with Governor Nelson Rockefeller on the financing and construction of the complex.

Queen Wilhelmina of the Netherlands named Corning an officer of the Order of Orange-Nassau, the country's highest citizen honor, in gratitude for his aid to Nijmegen following World War II.

== See also ==
- List of longest-serving United States mayors

New York State Assembly
Preceded by John H. Cahill	New York State Assembly; Albany County, 1st District; 1936	Succeeded by George W. Foy
New York State Senate
Preceded by William T. Byrne	New York State Senate; 30th District; 1937–1941	Succeeded by Julian B. Erway
Political offices
Preceded by Herman F. Hoogkamp	Mayor of Albany, New York; 1942–1944	Succeeded by Frank Salisbury Harris; Acting
Preceded by Frank Salisbury Harris; Acting	Mayor of Albany, New York; 1945–1983	Succeeded by Thomas Michael Whalen III
Party political offices
Preceded by William N. Haskell; 1943	Democratic Party Nominee for Lieutenant Governor of New York; 1946	Succeeded by Richard H. Balch; 1950
