= The Record (Troy) =

Newspaper in Troy, New York

- Type: Daily newspaper
- Format: Broadsheet
- Owner: 21st Century Media
- Founded: 1896; 130 years ago
- Headquarters: Troy, New York, U.S.
- Circulation: 7,134 daily (as of 2017)
- Website: troyrecord.com

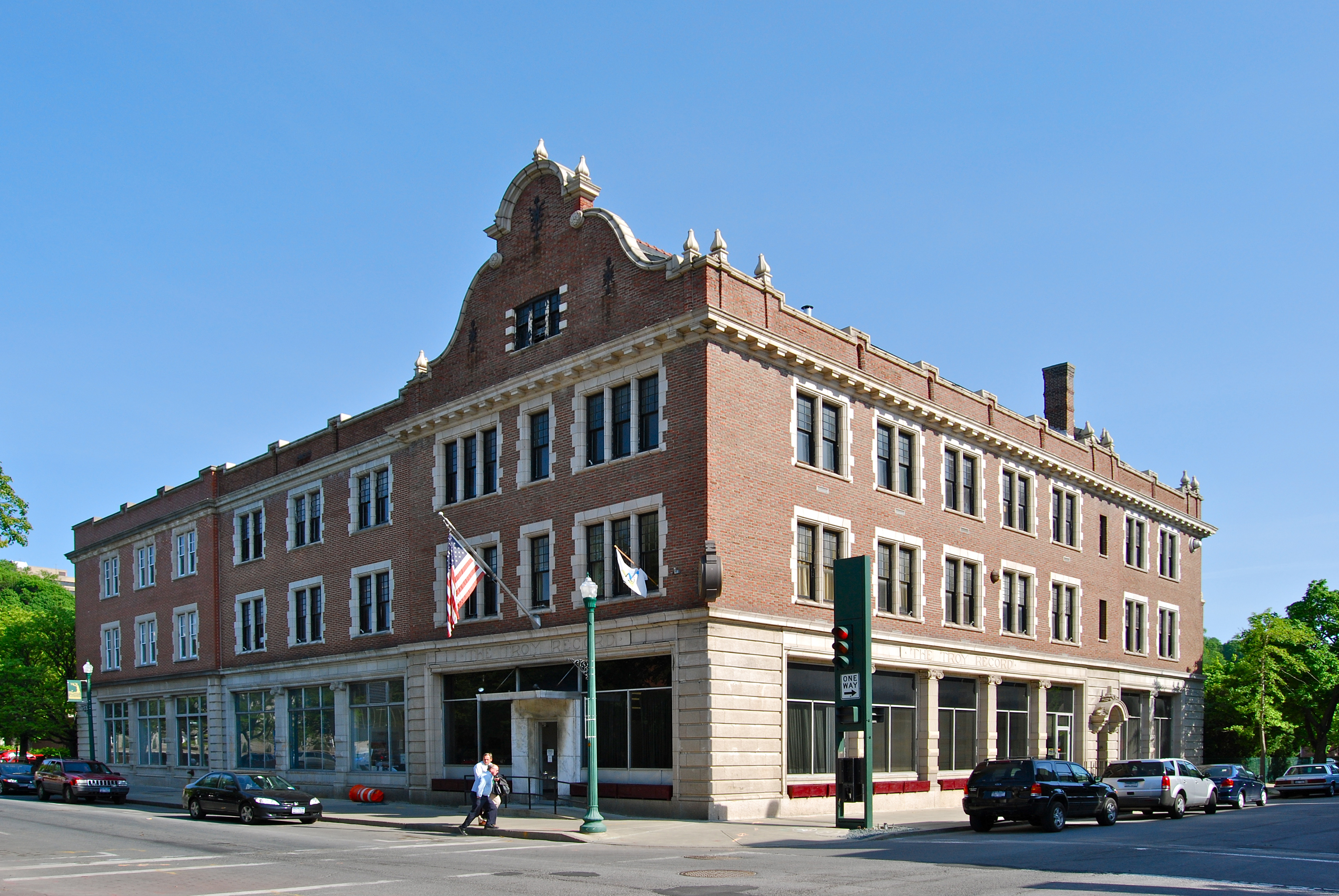
The former Troy Record Building on Broadway

The Record (also known as The Troy Record) is a primarily digital newspaper reporting on events in and around Troy, New York, United States. Founded in 1896, it was previously a broadsheet daily newspaper. The paper is owned by 21st Century Media.

The Record covers all of New York's Capital Region and specifically the city of Troy. On September 1, 2005, The Record changed from a traditional broadsheet layout to a tabloid format similar to that of certain big-city newspapers, but subsequently changed back to its original format. The newspaper's offices were located on Broadway in downtown Troy, until the paper shuttered its offices in early 2019. It is now mainly digital, though the print edition is still published.

The Record is the official newspaper of the City of Cohoes.
