= Alexander Brush =

American politician (1824–1892)

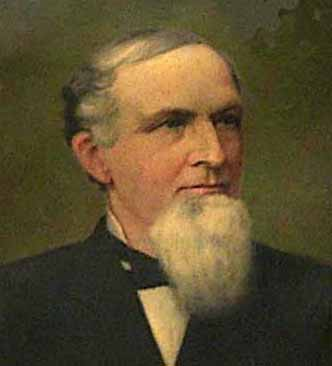
- Portrait of Brush, c. 1870

30th and 34th Mayor of Buffalo, New York
- In office 1880–1881
- Preceded by: Solomon Scheu
- Succeeded by: Grover Cleveland
- In office 1870–1873
- Preceded by: William Findlay Rogers
- Succeeded by: Lewis P. Dayton

Personal details
- Born: February 8, 1824 Edinburgh, Scotland
- Died: June 1, 1892 (aged 68) At sea
- Party: Republican
- Spouses: Lucinda Bucklin (m. 1862; died 1862) Sarah Warner Leonard (m. 1866–1892)

Alexander Brush (February 8, 1824 – June 1, 1892) was the mayor of Buffalo, New York, serving 1870–1873 and 1880–1881.

== Early life ==
He was born on February 8, 1824, in the small hamlet of Brushland, town of Bovina, Delaware County, New York. The Brush family was of Scottish ancestry.

== Career ==
In 1844, he moved to Buffalo and opened a brick making business.

Brush first served as Alderman for the third Ward in 1861 and reelected to that position until becoming street commissioner. He was elected mayor November 2, 1869, as the Republican candidate, defeating Thomas Clark. He was re-elected in a special election held in February 1872.

During his term the cornerstone was laid for the County and City Hall, which was not completed until early in 1876. At the end of his second term, he declined to be a candidate for re-election. In 1879, six years after retiring from public office, on November 4, 1879, he was once again elected mayor and served until 1881.

== Personal life ==
In April 1862, he married Lucinda Bucklin (1840–1862) of Titusville, Pennsylvania; she died within the year and he remarried in 1866 to Mrs. Sarah A. (née Warner) Leonard (1835–1902) of South Wales, New York.

He died while traveling to Europe on June 1, 1892. His body was laid to rest in Forest Lawn Cemetery.

Political offices
Preceded by William Findlay Rogers	Mayor of Buffalo, NY; 1870–1873	Succeeded by Lewis P. Dayton
Preceded by Solomon Scheu	Mayor of Buffalo, NY; 1880–1881	Succeeded by Grover Cleveland
