= Solomon Scheu =

American politician

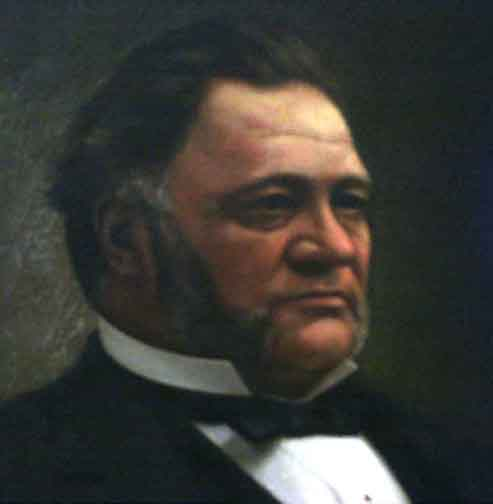

33rd Mayor of Buffalo
- In office 1878–1879
- Preceded by: Philip Becker
- Succeeded by: Alexander Brush

New York State Prison Inspector
- In office January 1, 1868 – December 31, 1873
- Preceded by: John Hammond
- Succeeded by: David B. McNeil

Personal details
- Born: January 6, 1822 Standenbühl, Kingdom of Bavaria
- Died: November 23, 1888 (aged 66) Buffalo, New York, United States
- Party: Democratic
- Spouse: Wilhelmina Rink
- Children: eight children
- "Solomon Scheu". Through The Mayor's Eyes, The Only Complete History of the Mayor's of Buffalo, New York, Compiled by Michael Rizzo. The Buffalonian is produced by The Peoples History Union. 2009-05-27.

Solomon Scheu (January 6, 1822 – November 23, 1888) was an American businessman and politician from New York.

== Life ==
He came to the United States in 1839 to live with an uncle and a brother in New York City, and learned the baker's trade. In 1844, he removed to Buffalo, New York, where his brother Jacob lived. They opened a bakery, later a grocery business, and then a malt factory. In 1847, he married Wilhelmina Rink, and they had seven sons and a daughter.

He entered politics as a Democrat, and was alderman from the Sixth Ward in 1855. He was Receiver of Taxes from 1856 to 1859. He was an Alderman again in 1866 and 1867.

He was an Inspector of State Prisons from 1868 to 1873, elected in 1867 and 1870.

In November 1877, he was elected Mayor of Buffalo by a slim margin in a three-way race, defeating the incumbent Republican Philip Becker (vote: Scheu 8,756; Becker 8,159; Edward Bennett, Tax Payers Party, 6,216). He was in office from January 7, 1878, to January 1880, but was defeated for re-election in 1879 by Alexander Brush (vote: Brush 13,721; Scheu 12,189). In 1887, he ran again for Mayor but was defeated by the incumbent Philip Becker (vote: Becker 17,925; Scheu 17,451).

He died of "paralysis", and was buried at the Forest Lawn Cemetery, Buffalo.

His son Solomon Scheu (1850–1895) was also an alderman of Buffalo.

== See also ==
- German American

== Sources ==
- The Mayors of Buffalo, at The Buffalonian
- Death notice of his son, in NYT on March 28, 1895

Political offices
Preceded by Philip Becker	Mayor of Buffalo, NY; 1878–1880	Succeeded by Alexander Brush
