= William Findlay Rogers =

American politician

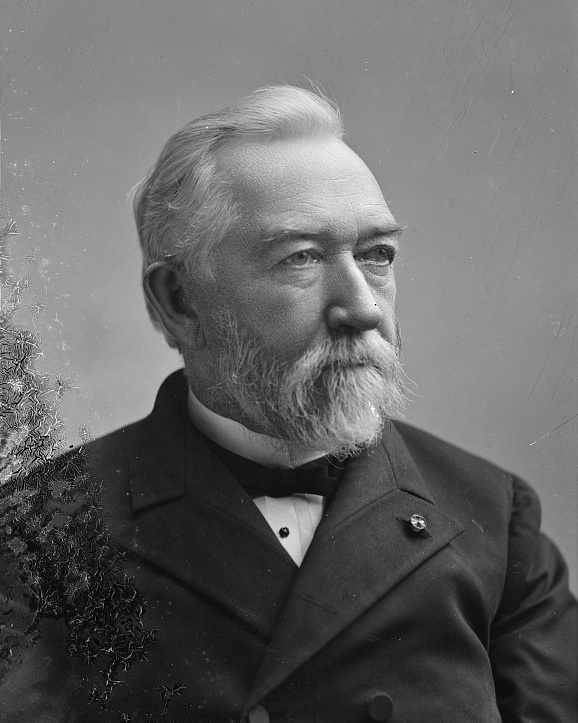

Member of the U.S. House of Representatives from New York's 32nd district
- In office March 4, 1883 – March 3, 1885
- Preceded by: Jonathan Scoville
- Succeeded by: John M. Farquhar

29th Mayor of Buffalo, New York
- In office 1868–1869
- Preceded by: Chandler J. Wells
- Succeeded by: Alexander Brush

Personal details
- Born: March 1, 1820 Forks Township, Pennsylvania, U.S.
- Died: December 16, 1899 (aged 79) Buffalo, New York, U.S.
- Party: Democratic
- Spouses: Caroline Waldron (died 1847) Phoebe Demony (m. 1849; died 1890)
- Children: 4
- Parent: Thomas Jones Rogers

Military service
- Allegiance: United States; Union
- Branch/service: Union Army
- Years of service: 1861-1863
- Rank: Colonel; Bvt. Brigadier General Major General
- Commands: 21st New York Infantry
- Battles/wars: American Civil War

William Findlay Rogers (March 1, 1820 – December 16, 1899) was an American politician who served one term as a member of the U.S. House of Representatives from New York from 1883 to 1885.

Rogers is probably best remembered today as the mayor and parks commissioner who hired Frederick Law Olmsted to design Buffalo's park system and its showpiece, Delaware Park. Rogers also supported the foundation of the Buffalo Zoo.

== Early life ==
Rogers was born in Forks Township, Pennsylvania, near the borough of Easton, Pennsylvania, on March 1, 1820. He was the son of Irish-born U.S. Representative Thomas Jones Rogers and Mary (née Winters) Rogers, daughter of Christian Winters.

In 1832, he moved with his parents to Philadelphia, where he attended the city's common schools. Rogers returned to Easton and entered a printing office in 1832. Two years later, he returned to Philadelphia, where he continued working in his trade.

== Career ==
In 1840, Rogers established a newspaper in Honesdale, Pennsylvania. In 1846, he moved to Buffalo, New York and became a foreman in the office of the Buffalo Daily Courier. Rogers established and managed the Buffalo Republic in 1850.

Rogers served as a member of Company D of the Buffalo City Guard in 1846 and served in the American Civil War as colonel of the 21st New York Volunteer Infantry. He mustered out in 1863.

=== Political career ===
In 1867, he became the comptroller of the city of Buffalo and its mayor in 1869. He served as secretary and treasurer of the Buffalo Park Commissioners in 1871. He was nominated for the New York State Senate in 1878 but declined.

==== Congress ====
Rogers was elected as a Democrat to the Forty-eighth Congress. He was not a candidate for renomination in 1884. He served as the superintendent of the Soldiers' and Sailors' Home at Bath, New York, from 1887 to 1897.

== Personal life ==
Rogers was twice married and the father of four children. He was first married to Caroline M. Waldron (1821–1847), and they were the parents of one son:

- Franklin Rogers, who became a printer.

After her death, he married Phoebe Demony (1830–1890) in 1849. They were the parents of:

- Mary Rogers, who married William C. Brown.
- Florence R. Rogers (1861–1932), who married Charles N. Armstrong (1858–1927).
- Thomas J. Rogers was a prominent civil engineer.

== Death ==
He died in Buffalo on December 16, 1899, and is interred in Forest Lawn Cemetery.

== Sources ==
- "William F. Rogers". Through The Mayor's Eyes, The Only Complete History of the Mayor's of Buffalo, New York, Compiled by Michael Rizzo. The Buffalonian is produced by The Peoples History Union. 2009-05-27.
- United States Congress. "William Findlay Rogers (id: R000407)". Biographical Directory of the United States Congress.
- William Findlay Rogers at The Political Graveyard

Political offices
Preceded by Chandler J. Wells	Mayor of Buffalo, NY; 1868–1869	Succeeded by Alexander Brush
U.S. House of Representatives
Preceded by Jonathan Scoville	Member of the U.S. House of Representatives from New York's 32nd congressional district 1883–1885	Succeeded by John M. Farquhar
