= 21st New York Infantry Regiment =

- Active: May 8, 1861 to May 18, 1863
- Country: United States
- Allegiance: Union
- Branch: Infantry
- Engagements: Battle of Gainesville; Battle of Groveton; Second Battle of Bull Run; Battle of South Mountain; Battle of Antietam; Battle of Fredericksburg

The 21st New York Infantry Regiment ("1st Buffalo Regiment") was an infantry regiment in the Union Army during the American Civil War.

== Service ==
The 21st New York Infantry was organized at Buffalo, New York and mustered in for two years state service on May 8, 1861 and subsequently re-mustered at Elmira, New York for three months federal service under the command of Colonel William Findlay Rogers.

The regiment was attached to Mansfield's Command, Department of Washington, to August 1861. Division of the Potomac to October 1861. Wadsworth's Brigade, McDowell's Division, Army of the Potomac, to March 1862. Patrick's 2nd Brigade, King's 3rd Division, I Corps, Army of the Potomac, to April 1862. 2nd Brigade, King's Division, Department of the Rappahannock, to June 1862. 3rd Brigade, 1st Division, III Corps, Army of Virginia, to September 1862. 3rd Brigade, 1st Division, I Corps, Army of the Potomac, to January 1863. Provost Marshal, General Patrick's Command, Army of the Potomac, to May 1863.

The 21st New York Infantry mustered out of service on May 18, 1863.

== Detailed service ==
Left Elmira, N.Y., for Washington, D. C., June 18. Camp at Kalorama Heights, Washington, D.C., until July 14, 1861. Garrison at Fort Runyon until August 20. Transferred to United States service for balance of state enlistment by order of Governor E. D. Morgan August 2, 1861. Moved to Rip Raps with mutineers August 20–30. Camp at Arlington Heights, Va., until September 28, and at Upton's Hill, Va., until March 1862. Advance on Manassas, Va., March 10–15. Camp at Upton's Hill until April 9. McDowell's advance on Falmouth, Va., April 9–19. Duty at Fredericksburg until May 25. McDowell's advance on Richmond May 25–29. Operations against Jackson June 1–21. At Falmouth until July 28, and at Fredericksburg until August 6. Pope's Campaign in northern Virginia August 16-September 2. Fords of the Rappahannock August 21–23. Sulphur Springs August 26. Gainesville August 28. Groveton August 29. Second Battle of Bull Run August 30. Maryland Campaign September 6–22. Battles of South Mountain September 14; Antietam September 16–17. Duty in Maryland until October 29. Movement to Falmouth, Va., October 29-November 19. Battle of Fredericksburg, Va., December 12–15. Assigned to provost duty at Aquia Creek January to May 1863. Chancellorsville Campaign April 27-May 6.

== Casualties ==
The regiment lost a total of 118 men during service; 2 officers and 74 enlisted men killed or mortally wounded, 2 officers and 40 enlisted men died of disease.

== Commanders ==
- Colonel William Findlay Rogers
- Captain George N. Layton - commanded at the Battle of Fredericksburg

== Notable members ==
- Captain Algar M. Wheeler, Company B - one of only six men to receive the Silver Citation Star for the Civil War Campaign Medal

== See also ==
- List of New York Civil War regiments
- New York in the Civil War
