= Grace Carew Sheldon =

American journalist

- Born: March 25, 1855; Buffalo, New York, U.S.
- Died: August 20, 1921 (aged 66)
- Resting place: Forest Lawn Cemetery, Buffalo
- Education: Wells College
- Occupations: journalist, author, editor, businesswoman
- Writing career
- Language: English
- Notable works: As We Saw It in '90 (1890); From Pluckemin to Paris (1898)

Grace Carew Sheldon (March 25, 1855 – August 20, 1921) was an American journalist, author, and editor, as well as a businesswoman. She was the founder of Woman's Exchange of Buffalo, New York. Sheldon gave drawing-room talks in cities around the United States and in Europe on Walter Scott and his works. She was a delegate to the International Press Congress, Bordeaux, France 1895. Sheldon was a correspondent for the Buffalo Courier in France (1895); and in South America (1896) for New York City and Buffalo papers. She was the author of, As We Saw It in '90 (1890) and From Pluckemin to Paris (1898).

== Early life and education ==
Grace Carew Sheldon was born in Buffalo, New York, March 25, 1855. She was the eldest daughter of Chief-Justice James, and Sarah (Carew) Sheldon; granddaughter of James and Sylvia (Alexander) Sheldon and of Daniel and Grace Billings (Palmer) Carew, and a descendant on her maternal grandmother's side, of Capt. George Denison, who came to the United States in the Lion when thirteen years of age, and settled in Roxbury, Massachusetts; and also of John Sheldon, who came to Dorchester, Massachusetts, early in the sixteenth century.

She was graduated from Wells College, Aurora, Cayuga County, New York, A.B., June, 1875. (Note: American Commonwealth Company (1914) recorded her date of graduation as 1878.) She received an advanced education in vocal and instrumental music, including vocal, instrumental and thorough-bass.

== Career ==
=== Business founder ===
After extensive travel in Europe, and wanting to do something outside society work, Sheldon founded the Woman's Exchange of Buffalo on May 1, 1886, and served as its president. Starting the business with US$150 of her own money, it was an organization for the disposal of handiwork of self-supporting women in the United States. She also was the founder and proprietor of Mental Clearing House for writing and handling manuscripts, as well as instruction in journalism and playwriting.

In 1901, fourteen years after it was founded, the Buffalo Exchange had 500 subscribers from all over the U.S., and had to remove to a new location, an entire house being fitted up for the various departments to which the exchange was developed. Every sort of work that a woman could do, from weaving rag rugs to washing fine laces found customers. Sheldon engineered the affairs of the exchange independent of committees and without red tape. The consignor's fee was US$2 for a year, 10 per cent off all sales and 5 per cent off ordered work. Sheldon attributed the success of the exchange to the simplicity of the management, to a careful study of the talents of women who submitted their handiwork, and to allot to each consignor the work for which she was best fitted. She said:— "most contributors are fine needlewomen, and most are just, prompt and agreeable to deal with. We have a great number of special workers who confine their work to our exchange. This makes us noted for our novelties and enables us to go to New York, Boston, Chicago, and other large cities and compete favorably with local firms. It also enables us to hold our customers from year to year, and thus augment our receipts. We make a specialty of house decorating, that is, all kinds of hangings, table, piano and mantel covers; and our Marie Stuart caps for evening and steamer wear have a national reputation. We can carry out any kind of work that a woman can do with promptness and perfection."

=== Writer ===
In 1887, in Buffalo and other cities, Sheldon originated drawing room talks on "European Cities", on "Scott and his Novels", and on art.

During the period of 1890 to 1900, Sheldon was a member of the staff of the Buffalo Courier. She was the first American woman delegate to the International Press Congress, Bordeaux, France, September 1895, acting at the same time as correspondent for the Buffalo Courier. Sheldon was sent to South America in February, 1896, as special correspondent on the gold mine controversy, and visited Venezuela (going up the Orinoco River to Ciudad Bolívar), also Curacao, Haiti, and the other West Indies, contributing articles meanwhile to the New York City and Buffalo press.

By 1891, Sheldon had become her own publisher. Discouraged in her quest for the book production of her foreign letters to the Courier, she edited her work into proper form, and with The Courier Co. as her printer, brought out her own book. As We Saw It In '90 was a good sample of a moderate-priced book. In 1897, she organized an independent newspaper syndicate, which she supplied weekly as she traveled. Two years later, she authored From Pluckemin to Paris (1899). It was a compilation of her letters which appeared in the columns of the Buffalo Courier, several years previous, descriptive of her travels in France. The information included things not usually found in guide-books., such as side-lights on out-of-the-way places. By 1914, Sheldon was serving as the department editor of the Buffalo Times and was a special writer for various papers and magazines in the U.S.

== Personal life ==
She was a charter member of The Scribblers' club of Buffalo; corresponding member of the National Geographic Society; and active member of the National League of American Pen Women. She died August 20, 1921, and was buried at Forest Lawn Cemetery, Buffalo.

== Selected works ==
- As We Saw It in '90 (1890)
- From Pluckemin to Paris (1898)
