= Edwin Jaeckle =

American politician (1894-1992)

Edwin Frederick Jaeckle

Chair of the New York Republican Party
- In office April 1940 – November 1944
- Preceded by: William S. Murray
- Succeeded by: Glen R. Bedenkapp

Chair of the Erie County Republican Party
- In office 1935–1948
- Preceded by: William J. Hickey
- Succeeded by: Harry J. Forehead

Clerk of Erie County Board of Supervisors
- In office 1920–1927

Member of the Erie County Board of Supervisors from Buffalo's 13th ward
- In office 1917–1920

Personal details
- Born: October 27, 1894 Buffalo, New York, United States
- Died: May 14, 1992 (aged 97) St. Petersburg, Florida, United States
- Resting place: Forest Lawn Cemetery, Buffalo, New York
- Party: Republican

Edwin Frederick Jaeckle (October 27, 1894 – May 14, 1992) was a Republican politician and party chairman in New York State during the 1930s and 1940s. During his tenure as chairman, Jaeckle enforced strict adherence to party discipline, which significantly bolstered the party's standing in the state.

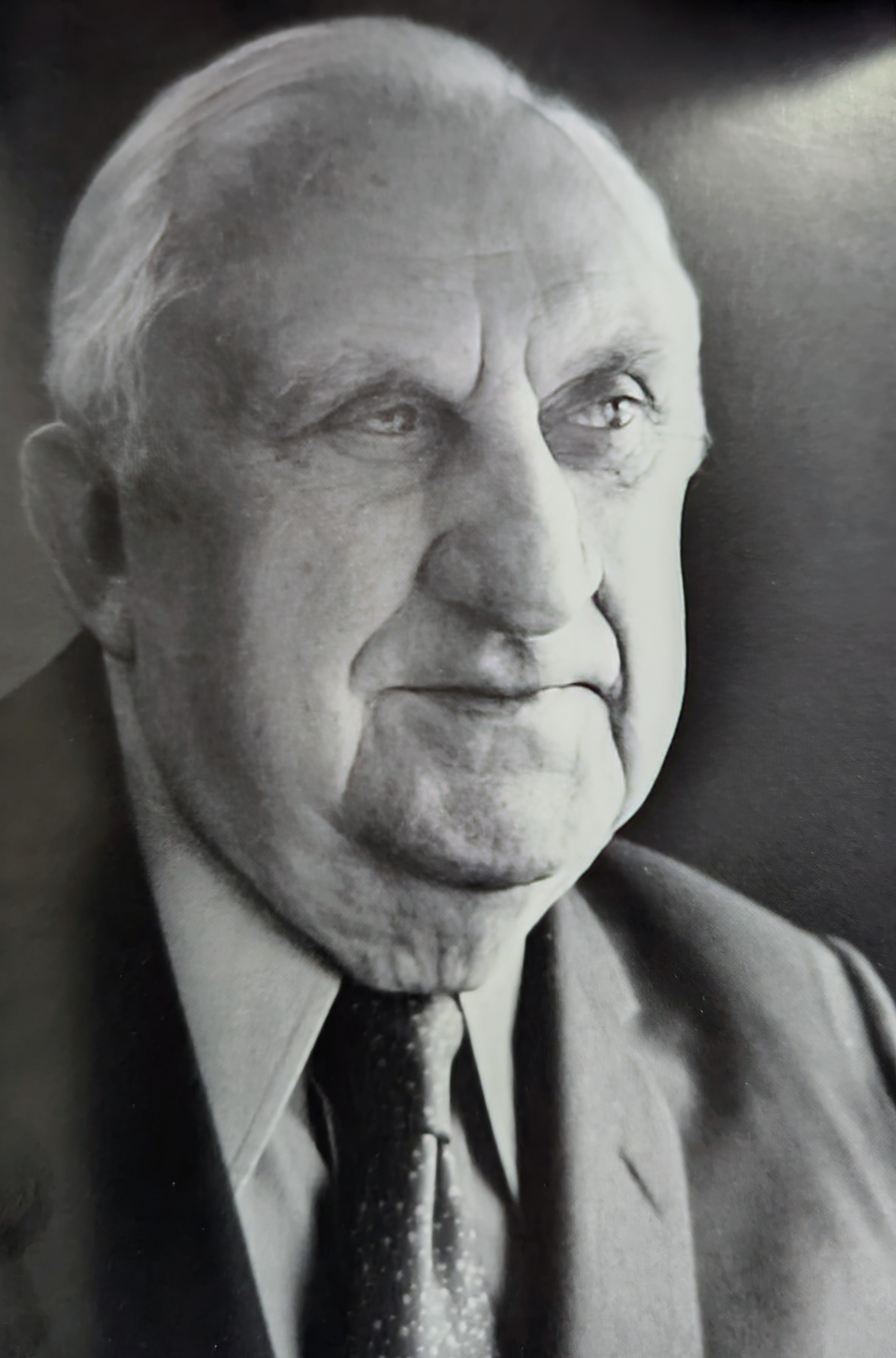
Edwin F. Jaeckle c. 1980

As chairman, Jaeckle exerted an outsized influence on the state's political landscape. In the 1944 book The Big Bosses, by Charles Van Devander, Jaeckle was portrayed as single-handedly controlling the state legislature and helping shape and execute the party's platform. According to the book, the Albany Legislative Correspondents' Association included in its annual satirical show a song with the refrain: "You've gotta get Jaeckle's O.K."

Jaeckle also sometimes played kingmaker; for instance, he selected New York City District Attorney Thomas E. Dewey as the Republican candidate for the New York governorship. Dewey won the race and served three terms as governor; Jaeckle is credited with helping lift him onto the national stage. Dewey later lost two unsuccessful campaigns for the White House in the 1940s. Jaeckle was Dewey's campaign chairman during his first presidential run. "'I was not Dewey's man,' Mr. Jaeckle recalled in an interview. 'Nor was he mine. Events brought us together. We were a strong combination. There was mutual respect. I was like a trainer with a good horse.'"

Jaeckle attributed his success as Republican Party leader in New York to integrity, tight fiscal control and tight control of his office holders. He also was a successful lawyer in private practice. His law firm, Jaeckle, Fleischmann & Mugel, which was perhaps the most stellar name in the Western New York legal firmament for decades, announced on September 30, 2015, that, as of January 1, 2016, it would cease to exist. The remnants of the partnership were joined into a Syracuse, N.Y.-based firm and, in a move that stunned observers of the legal profession, the iconic Jaeckle Fleischmann name was not retained.

== Early life ==
Jaeckle was born in Buffalo of pioneer stock to Jacob Jaeckle and Mary Marx Jaeckle, who themselves were born in Buffalo in the 1850s. His grandparents were Germans who had arrived in Buffalo during the great migration of the 1840s. His father was a carpenter who eventually became a general building contractor. Among other projects, Jaeckle's father literally built the family church, St. Peter's United Evangelical, completed in 1877.

For years the Jaeckles lived in the house Jacob built at 26 Lemon St. in the "Fruit Belt" of citrus-named streets in the German Near East Side of Buffalo. Mary Marx had grown up in that neighborhood, and her father had a grocery store on Mortimer Street. "They were just good hearty German-American people who worked like hell", Jaeckle recalled in 1980 in a Buffalo News article.

== Early political career ==
Jaeckle was first exposed to politics while attending the University of Buffalo Law School. A neighborhood restaurateur, Leo J. Schmidt — a family friend — was running for state committeeman and needed help. Jaeckle, then 20, offered his services, primarily driving Schmidt around.

Jaeckle graduated in 1915 and was admitted to the New York Bar in 1916. Shortly after, Schmidt suggested that he run for the Erie County Board of Supervisors in the 13th Ward. In 1917, at age 22, he ran for the nomination against a Republican incumbent. He won the general election, after a brutal primary campaign.

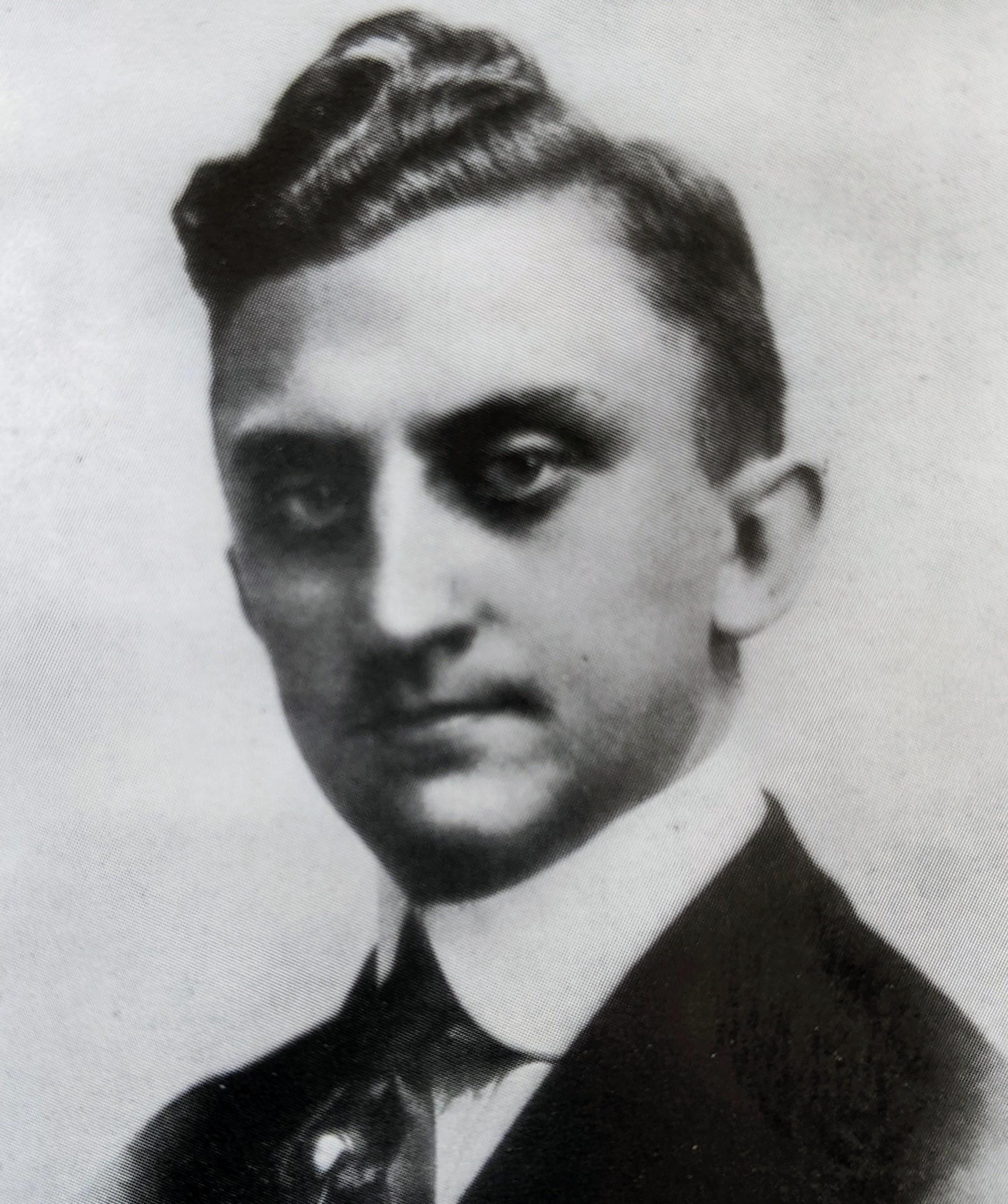
Jaeckle in 1917 as Board of Supervisors Candidate

After having served in the United States Navy during World War I, Jaeckle returned to New York to build his private law practice. In 1920, he became clerk of the County Board of Supervisors. In 1927 he became back tax collector for the county treasurer. During this time he cultivated his inside knowledge of the political game. Jaeckle was elected Erie County (Buffalo) Republican chairman in 1935 and held the position with an iron fist until he resigned it in 1948, ostensibly to devote his full efforts to Dewey's 1948 presidential campaign. During his tenure, he made the county's political organization one of the most powerful in the nation and dominated local elections.

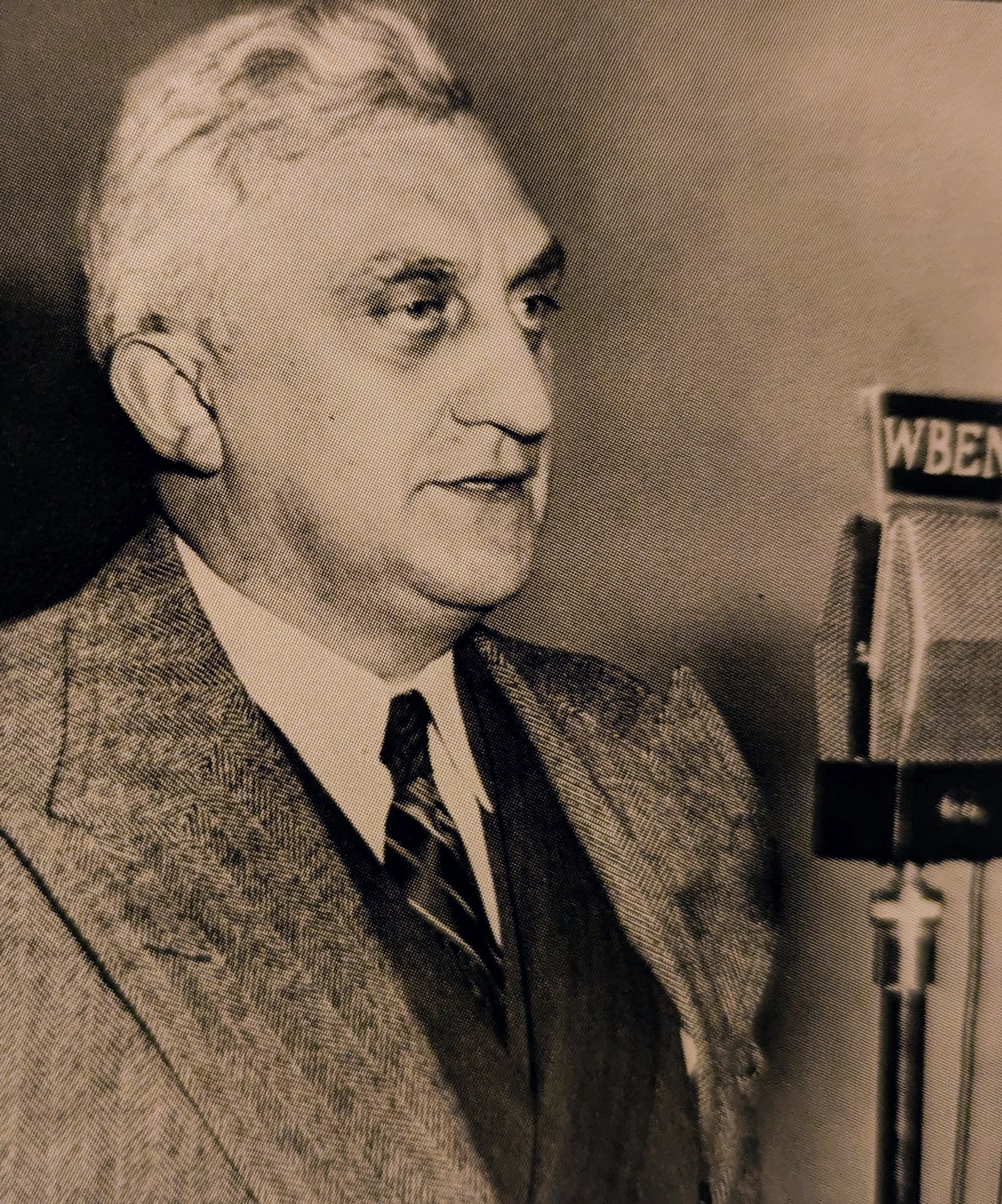
Jaeckle as Erie County Republican Chairman

== State chairman and beyond ==
In 1938, Jaeckle threw his support behind Dewey, a racket-busting New York City district attorney, to be the next New York governor. Jaeckle was the sole upstate chairman to push for Dewey's nomination behind the scenes; he also served as Dewey's floor manager at the state convention.

Dewey lost the general election to the Democratic incumbent Governor Herbert Lehman; but the Jaeckle-Dewey partnership was now established and the two men would advance each other's interests off and on over at least the next decade.

After the 1938 election, Jaeckle assumed the chair of the GOP State Executive Committee and, with it, de facto leadership of the state party organization. His election to the Republican state chairmanship came in 1940. He ran Dewey for governor again in 1942, this time successfully. Dewey would retain control of the office for twelve years.

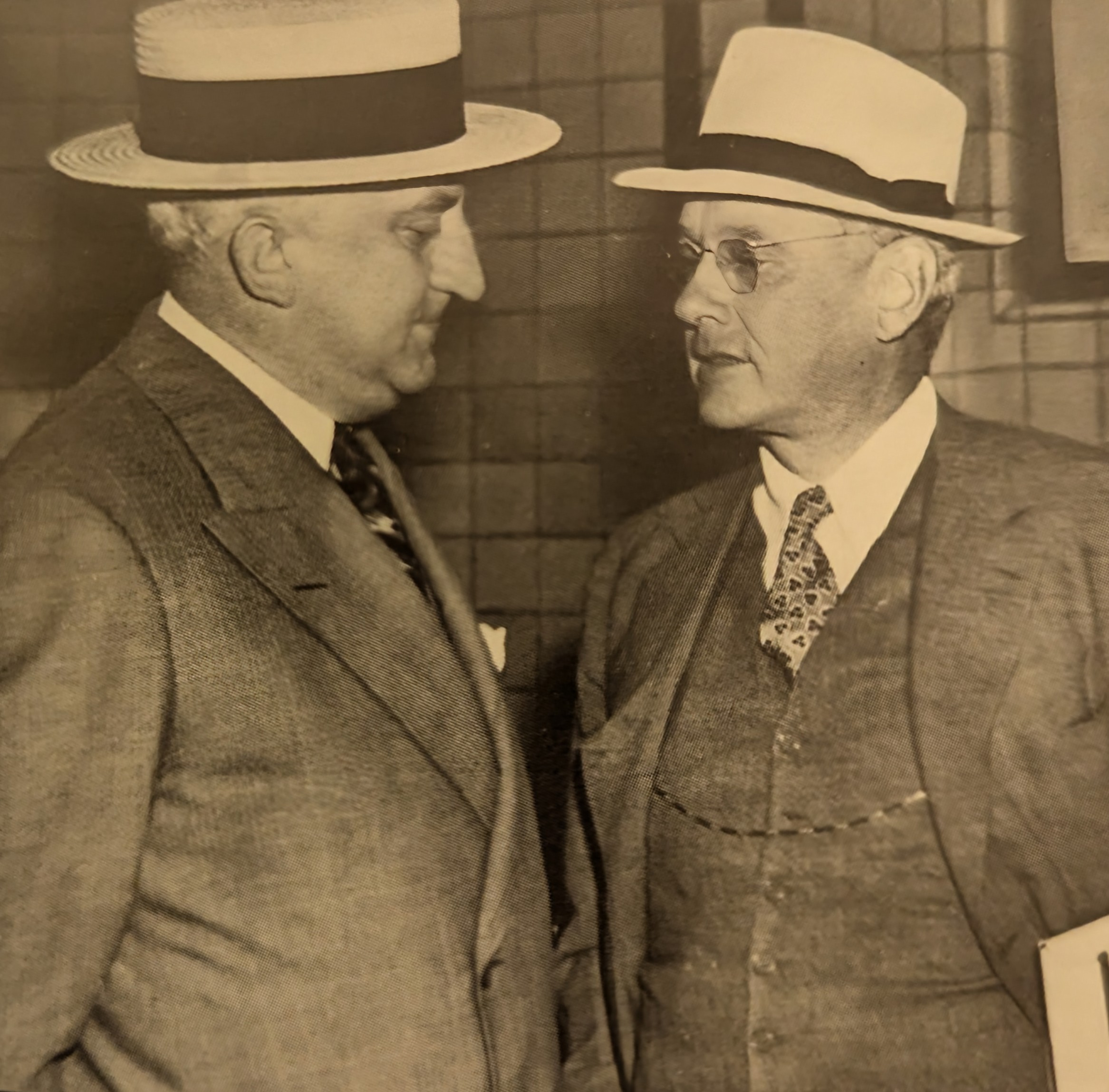
Edwin Jaeckle and Alf Landon

After Dewey's successful gubernatorial career, Jaeckle set to work helping campaign for the presidency in 1944, campaigning against Franklin D. Roosevelt.

In analyzing Dewey's success in maneuvering for the Republican nomination that year, Time magazine concluded it was due to the "power and precision of the politicos who surround Dewey" – "a group of political advisers perhaps unequalled since the first Roosevelt Brain Trust." Preeminent among them, the article listed Jaeckle, describing him as a "bulky, well heeled Buffalo lawyer, who almost singlehanded turned Buffalo's meager Democratic majorities into Republican landslides."

However, during the campaign against Roosevelt, Dewey broke with Jaeckle over strategy.

As Jaeckle recalled in a 1971 interview with The Buffalo Evening News, "I played the game until after the election, then I quit as state chairman." The two men later reconciled, and Dewey asked Jaeckle to join his 1948 presidential run against incumbent Democrat Harry S. Truman. Jaeckle agreed and served as Dewey's floor manager at the 1948 Republican National Convention. During the general election campaign, Jaeckle rode the campaign train with Dewey and did most of his political work.

As Dewey's floor leader at the 1948 Republican National Convention, Jaeckle had warned him not to believe the polls—which had Dewey a prohibitive favorite to beat Truman: "I told him that as a former D.A. he should attack, that he couldn't be a milquetoast and expect to win the election," Jaeckle recalled. "But he believed the polls. He didn't want to rock the boat."

Truman won the election in one of the biggest upsets in American political history.

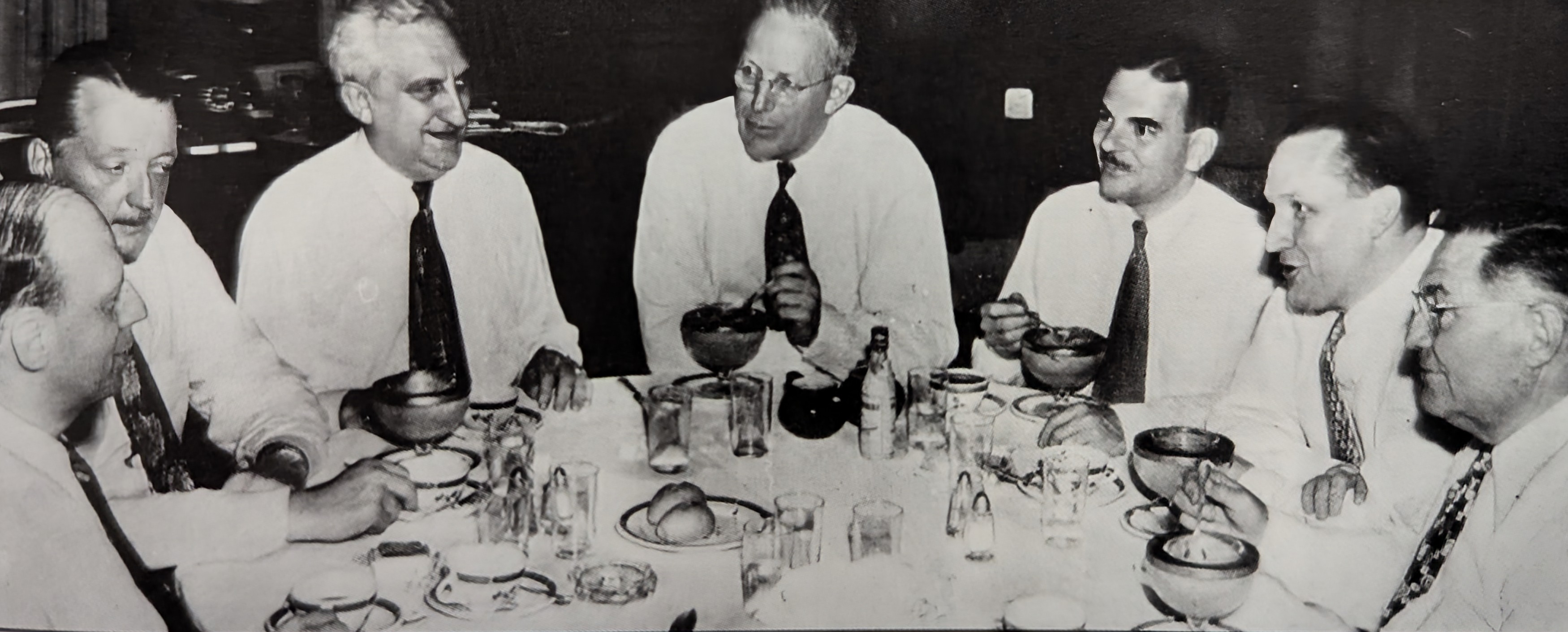
Jaeckle with Thomas Dewey and the 1948 Campaign Brain Trust

== Death and retrospective ==
Jaeckle was a liberal Republican who established a tough political machine, ran it with an iron fist, insisted on integrity in party and government affairs, and fostered a progressive agenda.

In his own dealings as party leader, he was attentive to his subordinates and fair but firm. As Van Devander noted: "Jaeckle spends half of each week at home and during the rest of the time shuttles back and forth to New York City [where his headquarters famously was the Hotel Roosevelt on Madison Avenue at 45th Street], to Albany when the legislature is in session [where his headquarters was the Ten Eyck Hotel], and to other parts of the state. He is in frequent touch will all of the county chairmen, and succeeds in giving them the double impression that he is devoted to their individual interests, and that he is quite capable of breaking any one of them, politically, who might attempt to put anything over on him."

In Life magazine's profile of Jaeckle in its June 12, 1944, issue, Arthur Dennis summarized Jaeckle's political philosophy while describing the fund-raising prowess that enabled him to make the New York Republican Party a well-heeled, well-oiled machine: "In New York Jaeckle has had periodic meetings with Banker Winthrop Aldrich and others on party finances, but with the explicit understanding that their contributions do not give them any operational control over party management. This fits in with Jaeckle's theory and practice that the real strength of a political machine is at the party-worker level, and that the leader who forgets this and begins to take his ease among the political Brahmins and the big-money boys is lost."

He lived long enough to see the demise of party control of politics and government and to lament the rise of the cult of individual personality over party organization. He believed this phenomenon fostered a lack of accountability in government. As he told The Buffalo News toward the end of his life: "Politics no longer operates the way it should. There's no party responsibility; too many individuals are calling the shots. ... Everybody is a victim of this system. In the old days, the party was responsible for the conduct of government. If you did the job right and served the people, they kept you in office. If not, you were gone. It's not like that anymore."

In his political retirement, Jaeckle built a substantial law practice and a substantial personal fortune. After retirement from his law practice at the age of 93, he divided his time between Rochester, Minnesota, and St. Petersburg, Florida. He died on May 14, 1992, in St. Petersburg of pancreatic cancer at age 97. He is buried at Buffalo's Forest Lawn Cemetery.

Jaeckle's papers covering his activities from 1911 to 1992 on the local, state and national levels, as well as recordings and notes of interviews conducted in 1981 by Professor Emeritus William E. Diez of the University of Rochester (NY), are housed at the University of Rochester, Department of Rare Books, Special Collections and Preservation.

Jaeckle was instrumental in creating the State University of New York at Buffalo. In this recorded interview, conducted in 1979 in his downtown Buffalo law office, Jaeckle discussed his role in bringing about the mergers that created the university, as well as his childhood in Buffalo, his early years in politics, and his philosophy of government.

The Jaeckle Center for Law, Democracy, and Governance of the State University of New York at Buffalo Law School, endowed by Jaeckle and named in his honor, focuses on "the ways in which law, politics and the principles of democratic self-governance intersect" and its projects include: The New York State Democracy Clearinghouse, and The New York Election News Blog.

== Highlights of Jaeckle's political career ==
- 1916: Wins a seat on the Erie County Board Supervisors from the old 11th Ward.
- 1918: Wins re-election but resigns in January 1919 to accept the position of Clerk of the Board of Supervisors.
- 1926: Wins a seat on the State Republican Committee.
- 1928: Named Erie County collector of taxes.
- 1935: Elected Erie County Republican chairman.
- 1937: Runs for mayor of Buffalo and loses to Thomas F. Holling by 1,427 votes.
- 1938: Leads a group of GOP reformers in nominating Thomas E. Dewey for governor in an unsuccessful attempt to win the statehouse.
- 1940: Elected New York State Republican chairman, controlling the largest bloc of delegates at national conventions.
- 1940: Heads Dewey's unsuccessful presidential campaign. Wendell Willkie is his party's nominee and loses to incumbent President Roosevelt.
- 1942: Dewey wins the governorship and Jaeckle is put in charge of shepherding Dewey's legislative agenda.
- 1944: Leads drive for Dewey presidential nomination by acclamation at Chicago convention. Dewey loses wartime election to incumbent Roosevelt.
- 1944: Quits as state GOP chairman 10 days after the Dewey defeat.
- 1947: Dewey and Jaeckle reconcile and Dewey eyes another run at the White House.
- 1948: Accompanies Dewey on the campaign train throughout the fall, but in November, Dewey is upset by Truman.
- 1948: Shortly after the election, Jaeckle retires from politics to work full-time at his private law practice.
