= Philip Becker =

American politician (1830–1898)

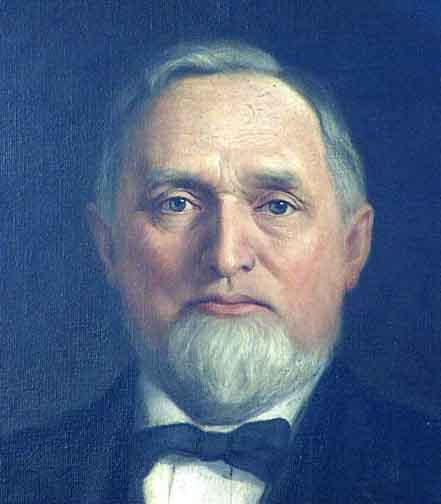
- Portrait of Philip Becker

32nd and 40th Mayor of Buffalo
- In office 1876–1877, 1886–1889
- Preceded by: Lewis P. Dayton, Jonathan Scoville
- Succeeded by: Solomon Scheu, Charles F. Bishop

Personal details
- Born: April 25, 1830 Oberotterbach, Kingdom of Bavaria
- Died: July 4, 1898 (aged 68) Buffalo, New York, United States
- Party: Republican
- Spouse: Sarah Goetz (m. 1852)
- Children: no children

Philip Becker (April 25, 1830 – July 4, 1898) was mayor of Buffalo, New York, serving 1876–1877 and 1886–1889. He was born in Oberotterbach, Kingdom of Bavaria, on April 25, 1830. He graduated from college in Germany at sixteen years of age. In 1847, Philip and his older brother were provided the means to pay the fare to America and he settled in Buffalo, where his aunt and uncle lived. In 1852, he married Sarah Goetz. He entered the retail and wholesale grocery business. A Republican in politics, his election as mayor on November 2, 1875, was followed quickly by his nomination as a delegate to the 1876 Republican National Convention which successfully nominated Rutherford B. Hayes for the presidency. It was also during his first term, in March 1876, that the new County and City Hall was opened.

Becker was defeated by Solomon Scheu in the election of 1877, but was reelected to a second term in 1885 and to a third in 1887. At the end of his third term, he did not seek re-election. He returned to his business enterprises and retired in 1893. Becker died on July 4, 1898, with an estate valued over $750,000 ($29 million in 2025). He was buried in Forest Lawn Cemetery under a truncated obelisk of polished black Quincy granite crafted by McDonnell & Sons which, at a weight of 48 tons, was the largest such piece of polished stone ever to have been manufactured at the time.

Becker is arguably most historically notable as a pioneer in, and champion of, German culture in Buffalo. Not only was he the first German-American to be elected as the city's mayor, but he was also instrumental in organizing the Buffalo German Insurance Company in 1867, serving as its president from 1869 until his death, and during the period between his first and second terms championed the construction of the Buffalo Music Hall on Main Street and the selection of Buffalo as the site of the 1883 German Sängerfest.

== Gallery ==
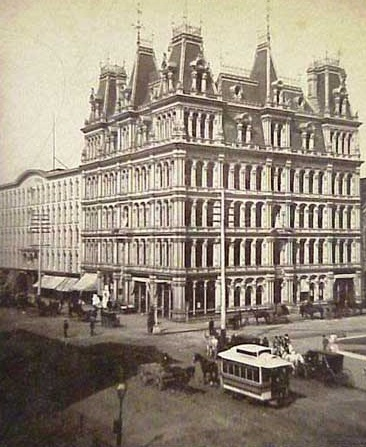
Headquarters of the Buffalo German Insurance Company, co-founded by Becker in 1867

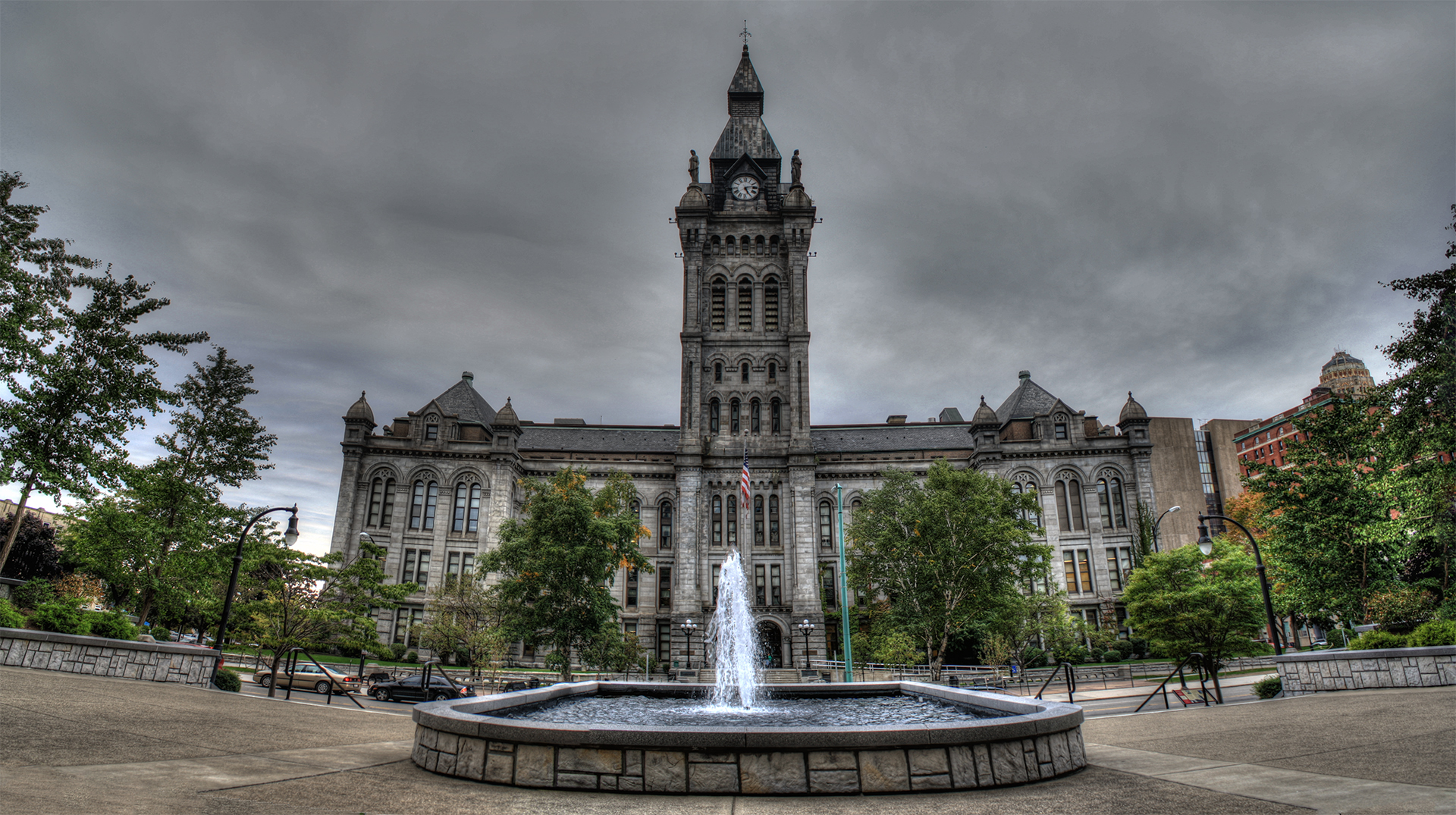
County and City Hall, opened in 1876 during Becker's first term as mayor

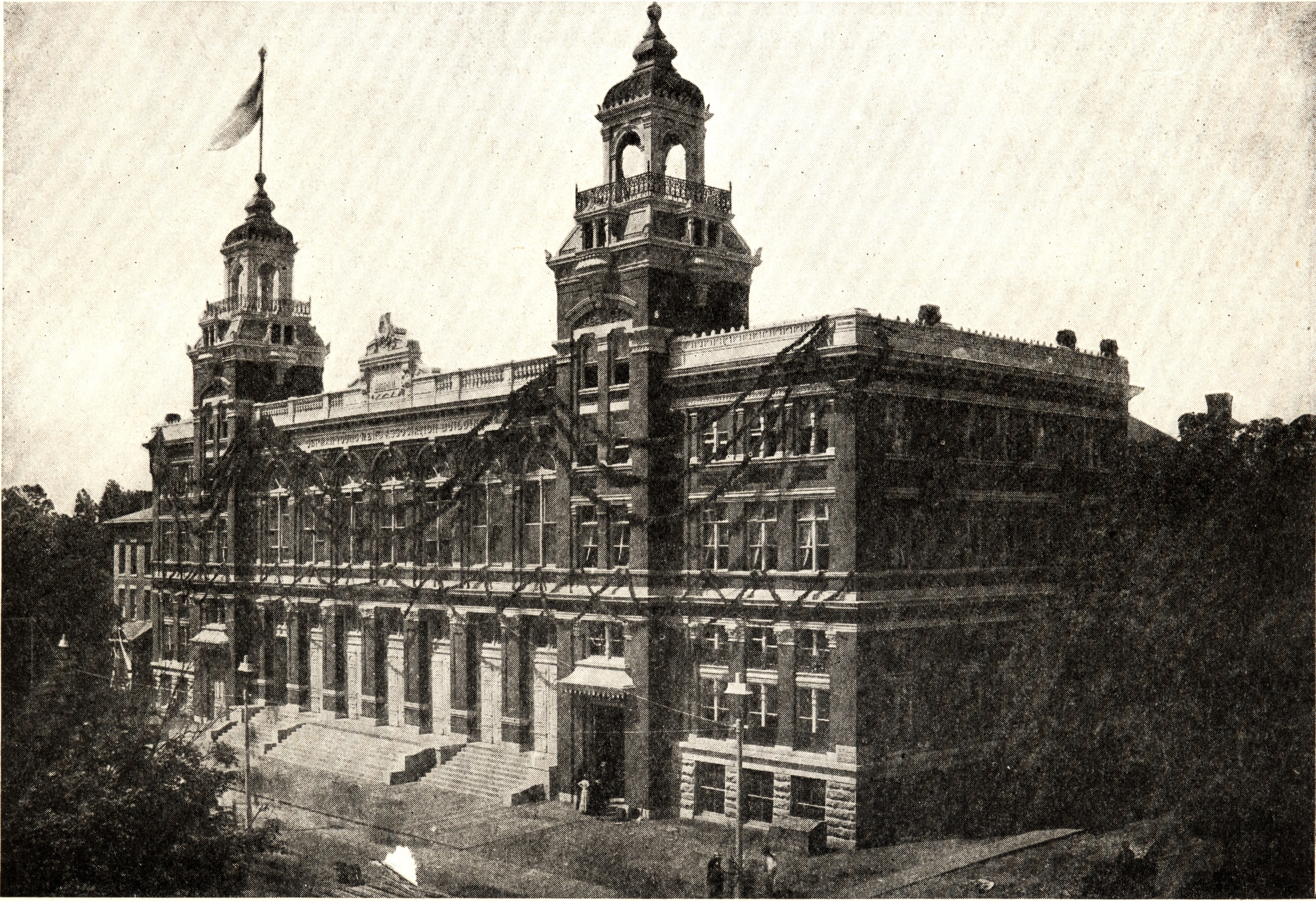
Buffalo Music Hall on Main Street, site of the 1883 German Sängerfest

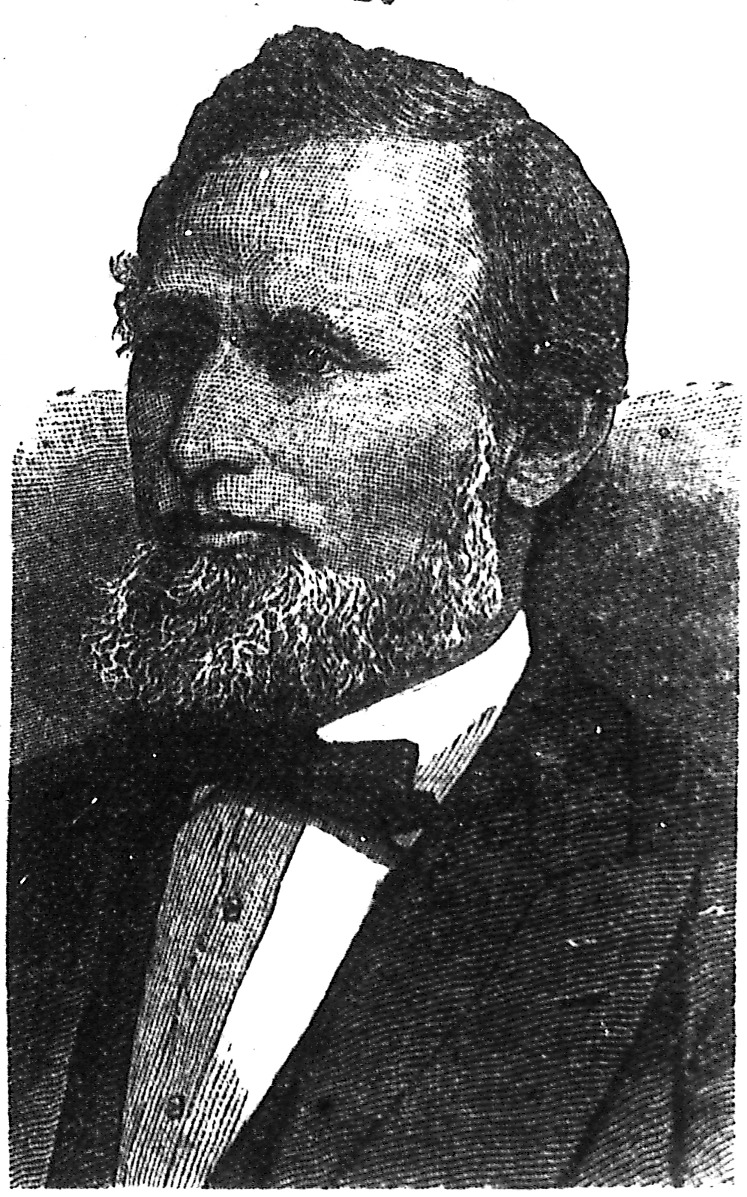
Becker depicted in a December 1885 issue of the Buffalo Evening News

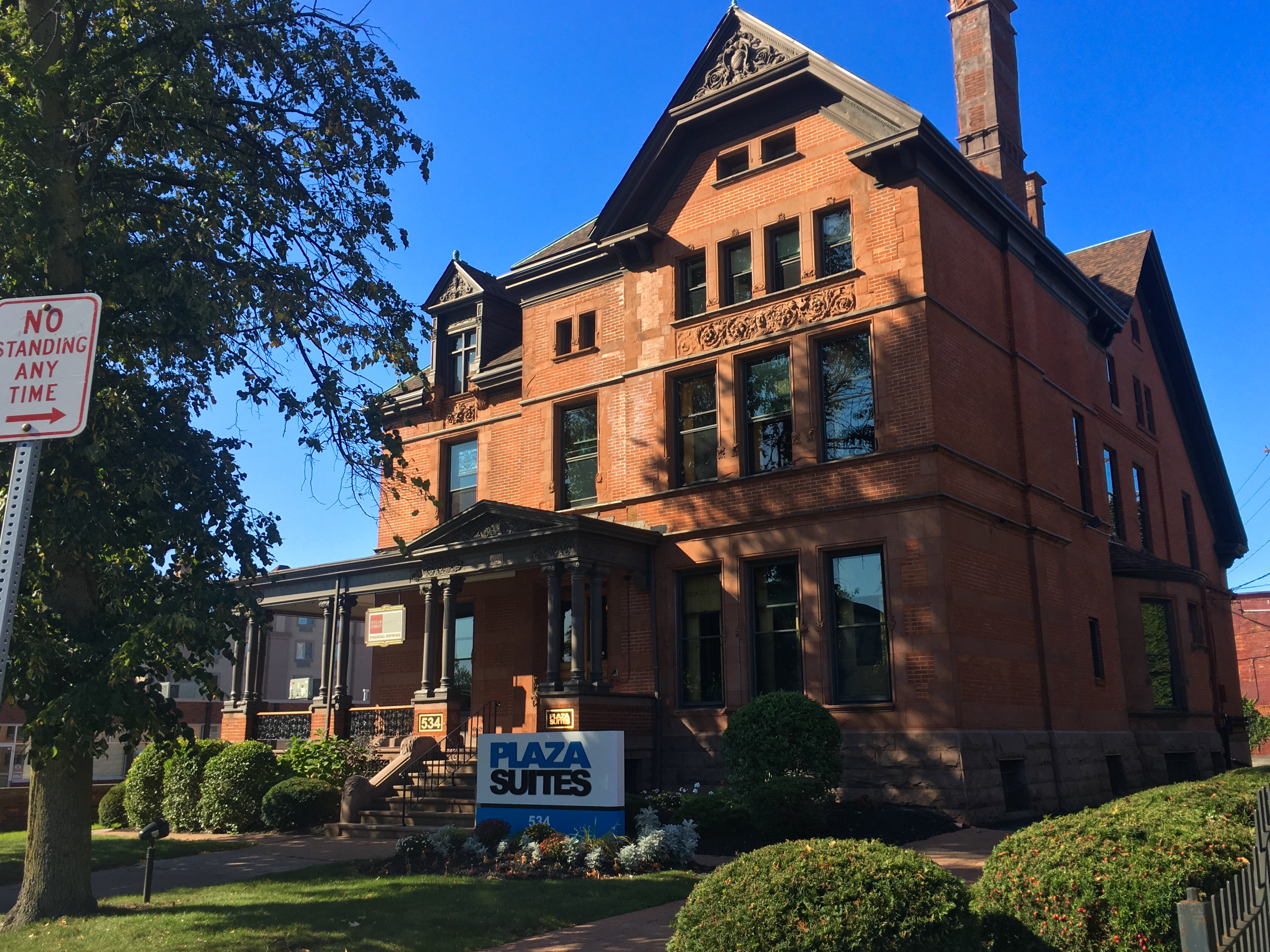
Becker's home on Delaware Avenue, in which he lived from 1886 until his death

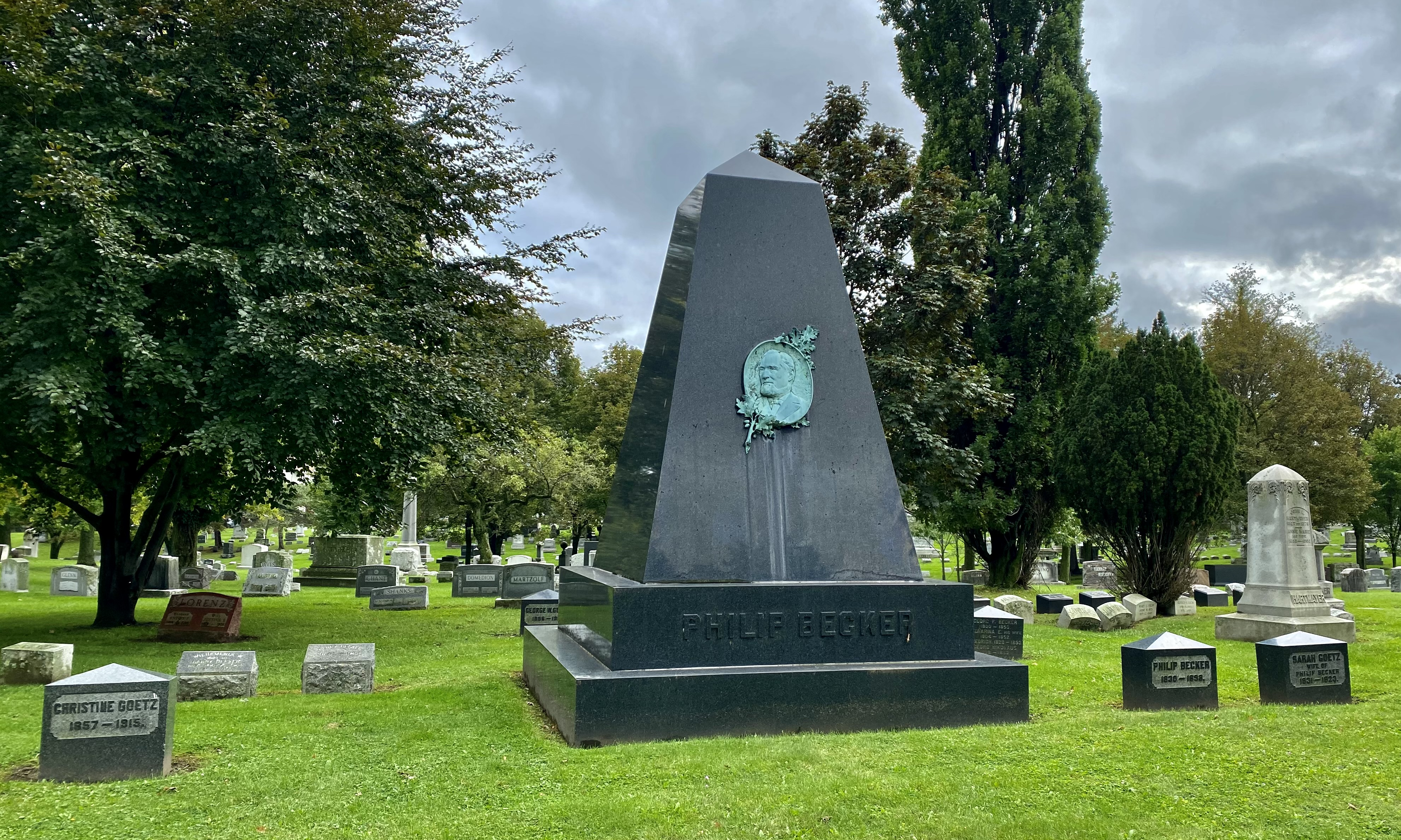
Becker's gravesite at Forest Lawn Cemetery

Political offices
Preceded by Lewis P. Dayton	Mayor of Buffalo, New York; 1876–1877	Succeeded by Solomon Scheu
Preceded by Jonathan Scoville	Mayor of Buffalo, New York; 1886–1889	Succeeded by Charles F. Bishop
