= Lewis P. Dayton =

American politician (1821–1900)

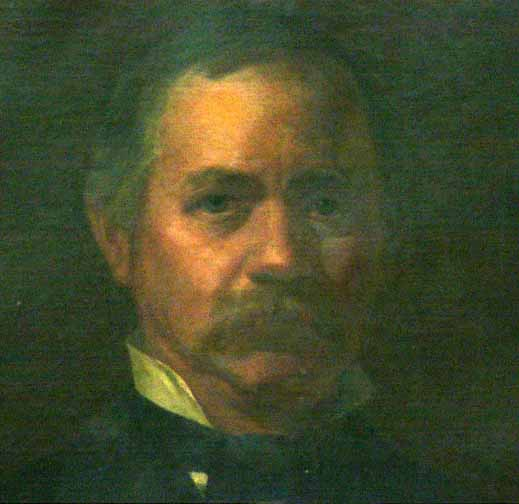

31st Mayor of Buffalo, New York
- In office 1874–1875
- Preceded by: Alexander Brush
- Succeeded by: Philip Becker

Member of the New York State Assembly from the Erie County's 3rd district
- In office January 1, 1868 – December 31, 1868
- Preceded by: Roswell L. Burrows
- Succeeded by: James A. Chase

County Clerk of Erie County
- In office 1865–1867
- Preceded by: Charles R. Durkee
- Succeeded by: John H. Andrus

Personal details
- Born: 1821 Eden, New York, U.S.
- Died: May 14, 1900 Buffalo, New York, U.S.
- Party: Democratic
- Spouses: Grace Webster Holley (m. 1846; died 1865) Mrs. Alice Maud Hayes (died 1873) Margaret Vogt (m. 1892)
- Children: 4
- Education: Geneva Medical College

Lewis P. Dayton (1821 – May 14, 1900) was Mayor of the City of Buffalo, New York, serving from 1874 to 1875.

== Early life ==
Dayton was born at Eden, New York, on the family farm in 1821. He was one of nine children born to John G. Dayton and Hannah B. Dayton.

He studied medicine in the office of Dr. Timothy T. Lockwood and moved to Buffalo. He graduated in 1846 from the Geneva Medical College, in Geneva, New York.

== Career ==
He returned to Buffalo as a physician in the Black Rock section.

He was first elected an alderman from the 12th Ward in 1855. He was Erie County Clerk from 1865 to 1867. He was a member of the New York State Assembly (Erie Co., 3rd D.) in 1868. In 1868, Dayton was appointed to the first Board of Park Commissioners and was chosen health physician for the City in 1871. On November 4, 1873, Dayton was elected mayor as the Democratic candidate. He did not seek a second term and retired to his private medical practice.

== Personal life ==
Around 1846, he married Grace Webster Holley (1828–1865), who died at a young age. Dayton first remarried Mrs. Alice Maud Hayes (1842–1873), who died about a year after their marriage, then in 1892, he married Margaret Vogt (1855–1930). He was the father of four children, including:

- Myron Holley Dayton (1849–1855), who died young.
- Clare Dayton (1851–1855), who died young.
- Jennie L. Dayton (1858–1940), who married Charles J. Vogt (1858–1924), the brother of his third wife.

He died on May 14, 1900, and was buried in Forest Lawn Cemetery. His brain was preserved in alcohol, possibly for medical research.

The Dayton House that Lewis P. Dayton lived in while residing in Black Rock, is located at 243 Dearborn Street. This home was placed on the National Register of Historic Places in 2011.

New York State Assembly
Preceded by Roswell L. Burrows	New York State Assembly; Erie County, 3rd District; 1868	Succeeded by James A. Chase
Political offices
Preceded by Alexander Brush	Mayor of Buffalo, NY; 1874–1875	Succeeded by Philip Becker
