= George Urban Jr. =

American businessman (1850–1928)

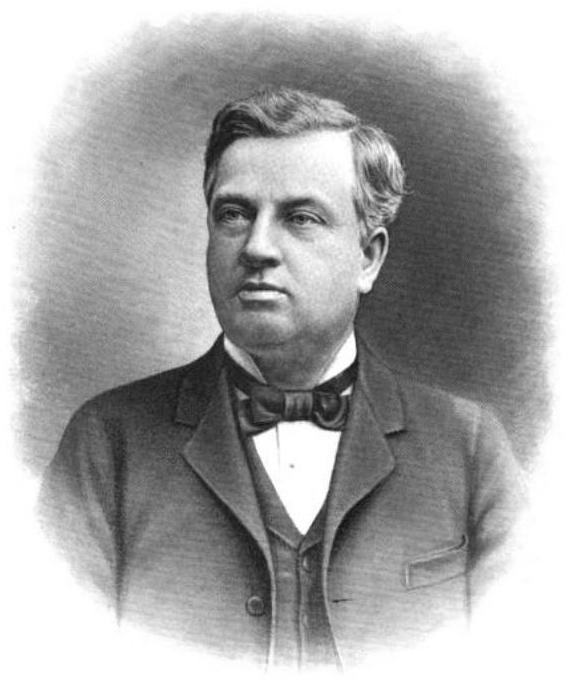
- Born: July 12, 1850; Buffalo, New York
- Died: February 23, 1928 (aged 77); Buffalo, New York
- Burial place: Forest Lawn Cemetery
- Occupation: Businessman
- Political party: Republican
- Spouse: Ada E. Winspear (m. 1875)
- Children: 4

George Urban Jr. (July 12, 1850 – February 23, 1928) was an American businessman from the state of New York.

== Life ==
Urban was born on July 12, 1850, in Buffalo, New York, the son of George Urban and Marie Kern, both German immigrants from Alsace. His father immigrated to America from Morsbronn and became a prominent Buffalo businessman.

Urban attended public school. He began working for his father's flour business when he was sixteen. In 1870, he became a partner in the business. He became in charge of the business when his father retired in 1882. He was a founder and the first vice-president of the Buffalo Loan, Trust and Safe Deposit Company, becoming its president in 1892. He was an organizer and president of the Thomson-Houston Electric Light Company, and when it was sold to the Buffalo General Electric Light Company he became a vice-president in the latter company. He was an organizer and director of the Belleuve Land and Improvement Company and the Depew Land Company. He was a director of the Merchants' Bank, the Bank of Buffalo, the Buffalo German Insurance Company, the Buffalo Elevator Company, and the Western Transit Company. He was president of the Buffalo and Niagara Falls Electric Light and Power Company and the Cataract Power and Conduit Company of Buffalo. His family's business was known as the George Urban Milling Company, and in 1903 the company built the first mill in Buffalo to be powered exclusive through electricity.

Urban was a delegate to the 1884 Republican National Convention. Although he was a Republican, he was close friends with Grover Cleveland and played a key role in Cleveland's presidential nomination. He was chairman of the Republican county committee and a presidential elector in the 1896, 1900, and 1904 presidential elections. He was a member of the New York Republican State Committee for several years. He lived in Cheektowaga.

In 1875, Urban married Ada E. Winspear of Cheektowaga. Their children were George Pennock (who became president of the George Urban Milling Company), Emma May, Ada Jeanette, and Clara Winspear (who married Dr. Charles W. Banta).

In 1924 a 5 miles long road named "George Urban Boulevard" after this family was constructed

Urban died at his home in Buffalo, following a three-week illness, on February 23, 1928. He was buried in Forest Lawn Cemetery.
