= Henry Moxley =

American businessman and activist

- Born: 1809; Virginia
- Died: December 12, 1878 (aged 68–69); Buffalo, New York
- Resting place: Forest Lawn Cemetery
- Occupation: Barber
- Known for: Promoting school integration and the education of African-American children

Henry Moxley (1809 – December 12, 1878) was an African-American businessman, religious leader and activist in Buffalo, New York. He is known for his work to promote school integration and the education of African-American children.

== Biography ==
Born into slavery in Virginia in 1809, Moxley escaped and settled in Buffalo in 1832. He worked at various jobs before becoming a barber who opened his own shop in 1839. Moxley was a deacon of the A.M.E. Zion church and was a principal organizer of the 1843 National Convention of Colored Men that was held in Buffalo. It was reported in the Buffalo Republic newspaper that on October 3, 1850, Henry Moxley was in attendance and elected vice president, along with others, during a meeting of colored citizens in which resolutions were passed against the Fugitive Slave Act of 1850.

In June 1867 Moxley, as part of a group of parents, argued before the School Committee of the Common Council regarding the segregated and then called "African school" on Vine Alley (present day William Street from Broadway to Michigan Avenue). It was their contention that the school was both poorly equipped and constructed along with having a location that caused long travel times for children who didn't live nearby. Because of these factors the parents felt this violated their rights under the Fourteenth Amendment. Moxley's children were expelled from school following an unsuccessful attempt by him and other African-American families to have their children not segregated in a separate building by attempting to enroll them in two neighborhood schools. When this proved unsuccessful Moxley and fellow African-American parents then filed suit against the school superintendent, along with the School Committee of the Common Council, with violating the Civil Rights Act of 1866. The lawsuit was thrown out in 1868 and Moxley was ordered to pay court costs of $192 ($3,088.55 in 2015).

Henry Moxley died on December 12, 1878, and was buried at Forest Lawn Cemetery in Buffalo. The Buffalo school system became integrated in 1881 which then allowed African-American students to attend the schools in their neighborhoods.
