= Dayton House (Buffalo, New York) =

Historic house in New York, United States

- U.S. National Register of Historic Places
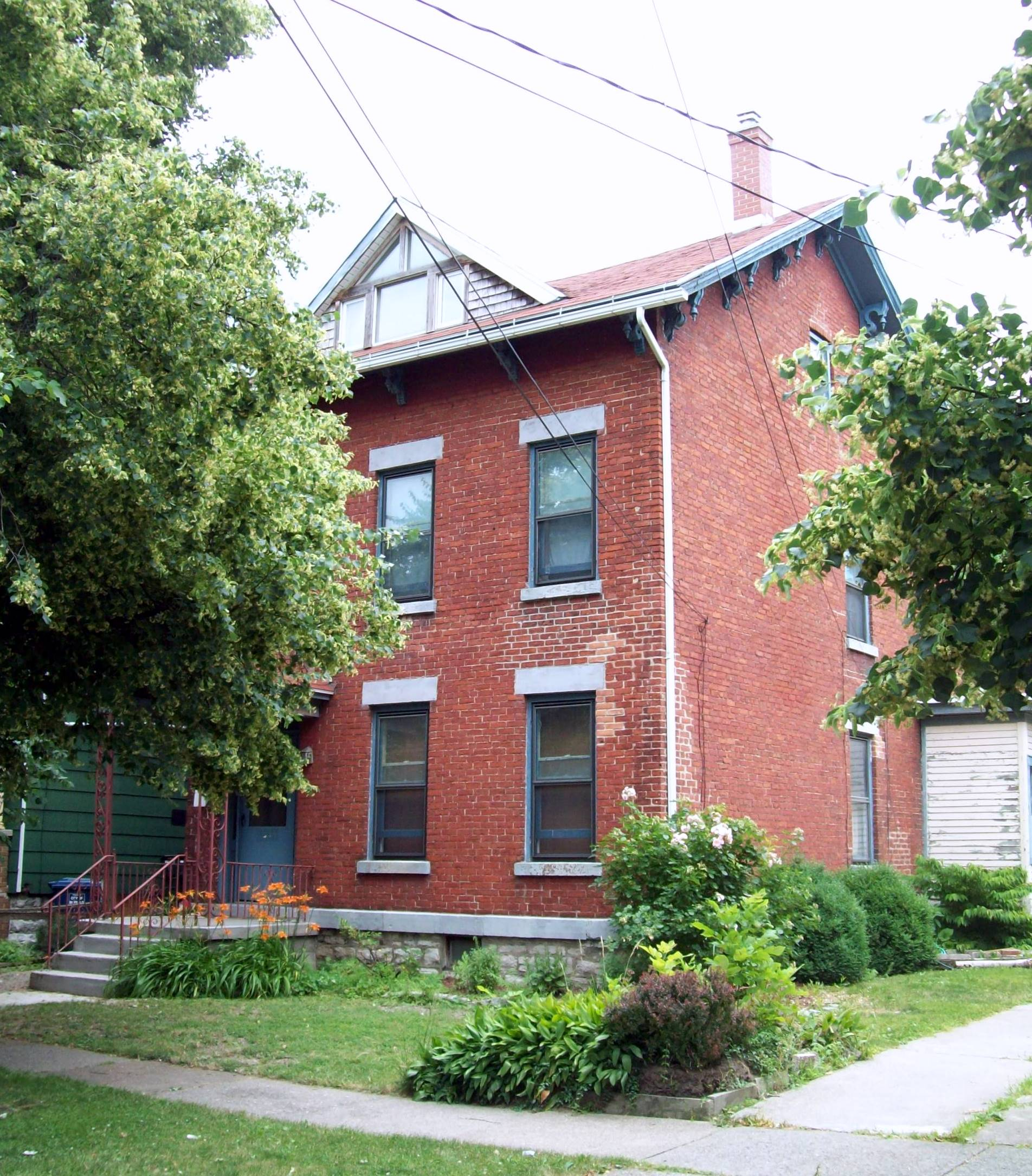
- Dayton House, July 2011

- Location within New York Location within the United States
- Location: 243 Dearborn Street, Buffalo, New York
- Coordinates: 42°56′9″N 78°54′5″W
- Architectural style: Georgian, Italianate
- MPS: Black Rock Planning Neighborhood MPS
- NRHP reference No.: 11000739
- Added to NRHP: October 18, 2011

The Dayton House is a historic home located at 243 Dearborn Street, in the Black Rock neighborhood of Buffalo, Erie County, New York.

It was the home of Lewis P. Dayton (1821–1900), noted physician and Mayor of the City of Buffalo, New York, serving 1874–1875. The house has been dated to about 1840 in the Georgian style. It received an Italianate update in the 1870s and is an excellent example of canal era prosperity. It is the only remaining brick residence of its style in Black Rock.

In 2011 the building was listed on the National Register of Historic Places.

== See also ==
- National Register of Historic Places listings in Buffalo, New York
