= Forest Lawn Cemetery (Buffalo, New York) =

Historic cemetery in Buffalo, New York

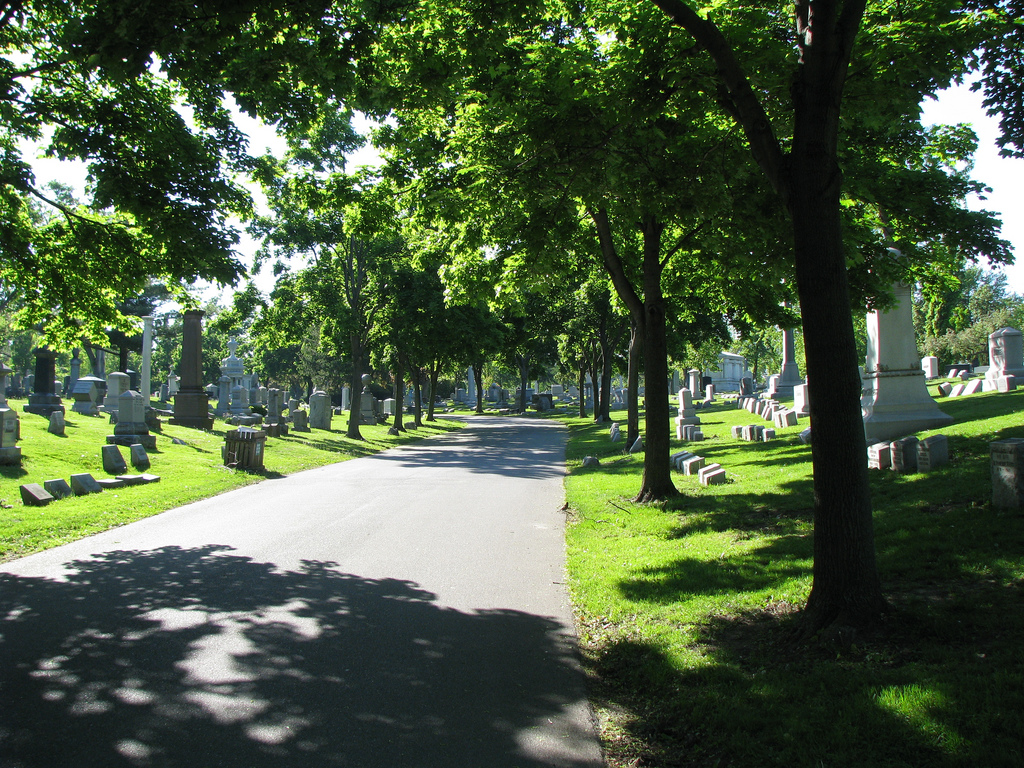
- Interactive map of Forest Lawn Cemetery

Details
- Established: 1849; 177 years ago
- Location: 1411 Delaware Avenue, Buffalo, New York 14209
- Country: United States
- Coordinates: 42°55′51″N 78°51′39″W
- Type: Public
- Owned by: Forest Lawn Group
- Size: 269 acres (1.1 km^{2})
- No. of graves: 165,000
- Website: Forest Lawn.com
- Find a Grave: Forest Lawn Cemetery
- Forest Lawn Cemetery
- U.S. National Register of Historic Places
- U.S. Historic district
- New York State Register of Historic Places
- Location within New York Location within the United States
- Location: 1411 Delaware Avenue, Buffalo, New York 14209
- Architects: Clarke, Charles E.; Earnshaw, Joseph
- NRHP reference No.: 90000688

Significant dates
- Added to NRHP: May 10, 1990
- Designated NYSRHP: March 7, 1990

Forest Lawn Cemetery is a historic rural cemetery at 1411 Delaware Avenue in Buffalo, New York, United States. Founded in 1849 by Charles E. Clarke, it covers over 269 acres (1.1 km^{2}). Over 165,000 are buried there, including U.S. President Millard Fillmore, First Lady Abigail Fillmore, singer Rick James, Congresswoman Shirley Chisholm, and inventors Lawrence Dale Bell and Willis Carrier. Forest Lawn is on the National Register of Historic Places.

== Overview ==
Since its inception, Forest Lawn has served as a cemetery, park, arboretum, crematory and outdoor museum. Monuments, mausoleums and sculptures have attracted visitors for over 150 years. The first sculpture of Seneca Indian chief Red Jacket was erected in 1851. Red Jacket is depicted wearing the richly embroidered scarlet coat presented to him by a British officer, while on his breast is displayed the large silver peace medal awarded to him by President George Washington.

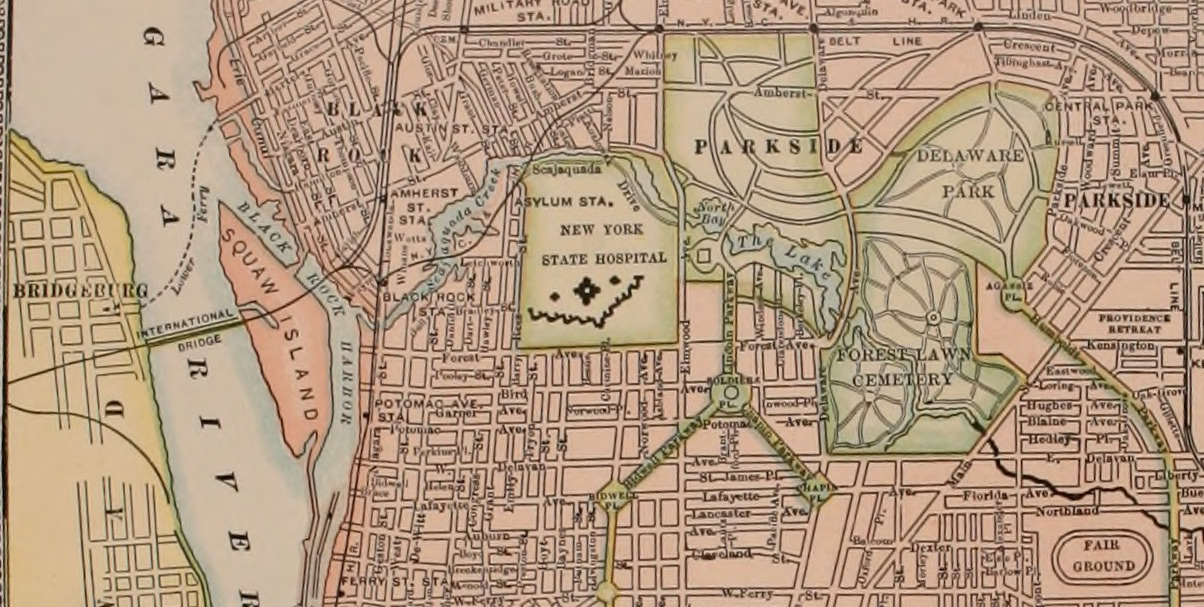
Forest Lawn Cemetery map in 1908

Every summer Forest Lawn offers "Sundays in the Cemetery" tours, each with a particular theme. Past examples have included the Pan-American Exposition Trolley Tour, Forest Lawn History Trolley Tour, Forest Lawn History Walk, Civil War Bus Tour and the Forest Lawn Nature Walk.

In 2023, Forest Lawn lobbied the city of Buffalo to block the construction of a four-story mixed-use building with 41 housing units on the site of a former gas station and vacant single-story retail building. Forest Lawn officials argued that the building would have adverse impacts on one of its crematories and cast shadows on the cemetery.

=== Margaret L. Wendt Archive and Research Center ===
In 2014, the 3,140-square-foot (292 m^{2}) Margaret L. Wendt Archive and Resource Center opened within the cemetery. It is a digitized history center, of interment records maintained since 1849, that features a number of interpretive displays highlighting the notable citizens buried in the cemetery. The building features climate controlled rooms and the design of the building mimics some of the historic structure that once stood at the same site. The staff includes Amizetta Haj (Interpretive Program Director), John Edens and staff. Construction and funding for the Center was provided by The Margaret L. Wendt Foundation along with support from The John R. Oishei Foundation.

=== Mausoleums ===
In 2004, Frank Lloyd Wright’s 1928 design for the Blue Sky Mausoleum was realized. The Mausoleum contains 24 crypts, which can be purchased and memorialized by individual owners. The Blue Sky Mausoleum is one of three Frank Lloyd Wright memorial sculptures in the world. Sculptor David P. Dowler created a Steuben Glass piece in a limited edition of 26, of which 24 are reserved for those who purchase crypts in the Mausoleum. Crypt clients also receive a copy of architectural historian Richard O. Reisem's 2005 book, Blue Sky Mausoleum of Frank Lloyd Wright.

Other mausoleums in the cemetery include:

- Burgess-Little Mausoleum – designed by H. H. (Henry Harrison) Little.
- Butler Mausoleum – constructed for Edward H. Butler, proprietor of the Buffalo Evening News.
- Buswell-Hochstetter Mausoleum
- Good Mausoleum – constructed for Daniel B. Good, who established the Seibert-Good Company in Chicago, which later consolidated with the Seymour H. Knox stores of Buffalo, N.Y. and finally amalgamated with the F.W. Woolworth Company.
- Goodyear (Frank) Mausoleum – constructed for Frank Henry Goodyear, who, with his brother, Charles W. Goodyear, started the Buffalo and Susquehanna Railroad.
- Kellner Mausoleum – constructed for John. S. Kellner, president of the Crystal Ice and Storage Company.
- Knox Mausoleum – constructed for Seymour H. Knox I, co-founder of F. W. Woolworth Company.
- Laub Mausoleum
- Letchworth-Skinner Mausoleum –
- Mitchel H. Mark Mausoleum – constructed for Mitchell Mark, founder of the Vitascope Theater Company
- Oberkircher Mausoleum – constructed for Caroline Oberkircher and family.
- Pierce (George) Mausoleum – constructed for George N. Pierce who co-founded a company known as Heinz, Pierce and Munshauer for the manufacture of refrigerators, birdcages, iceboxes and bathtubs, until leaving to establish the Pierce Cycle Company, which later became the Pierce-Arrow Motor Car Co.
- Stachura Mausoleum – constructed for Chester and Gloria Stachura.
- Steuernagel Mausoleum – constructed for John Steuernagel, president and board chairman of Kleinhans department store.
- Vars Mausoleum – designed by Lawrence Bley and Duane Lyman. Interred are Harry Thorp Vars, Gertrude Waltho Vars, Mary G. Vars, Addison Foster Vars, Addison F. Vars Jr., Aline Vars, Carlton J. Balliett, Evelyn Waltho Balliett Jr., Rose Waltho Brown, Bertha W. Barker, and Estelle Noell Reavis.
- Walden-Myer Mausoleum – designed by Richard A. Waite for Buffalo's mayor from 1838–39, Ebenezer Walden, and son-in law, Albert J. Myer, recognized by many as the "founder and father" of the US Weather Bureau.
- Willams-Pratt Mausoleum

== Gallery ==
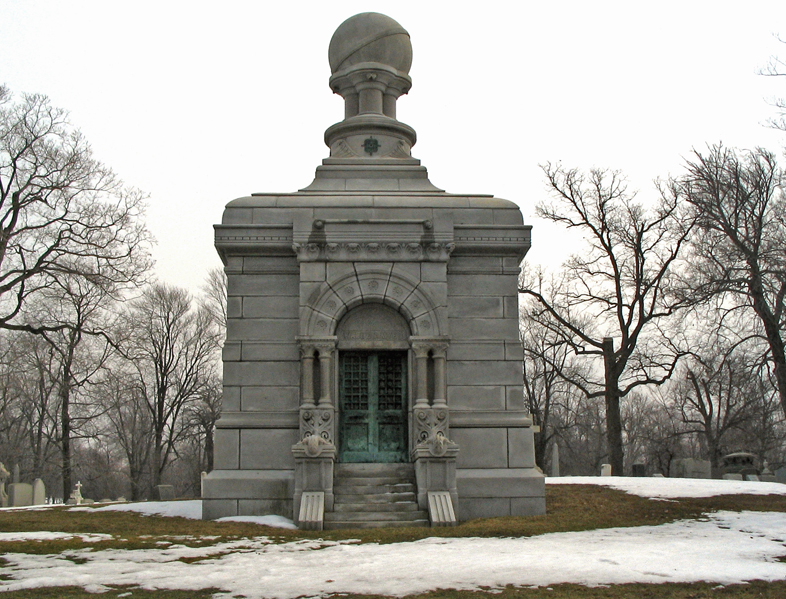
Walden-Myer Mausoleum

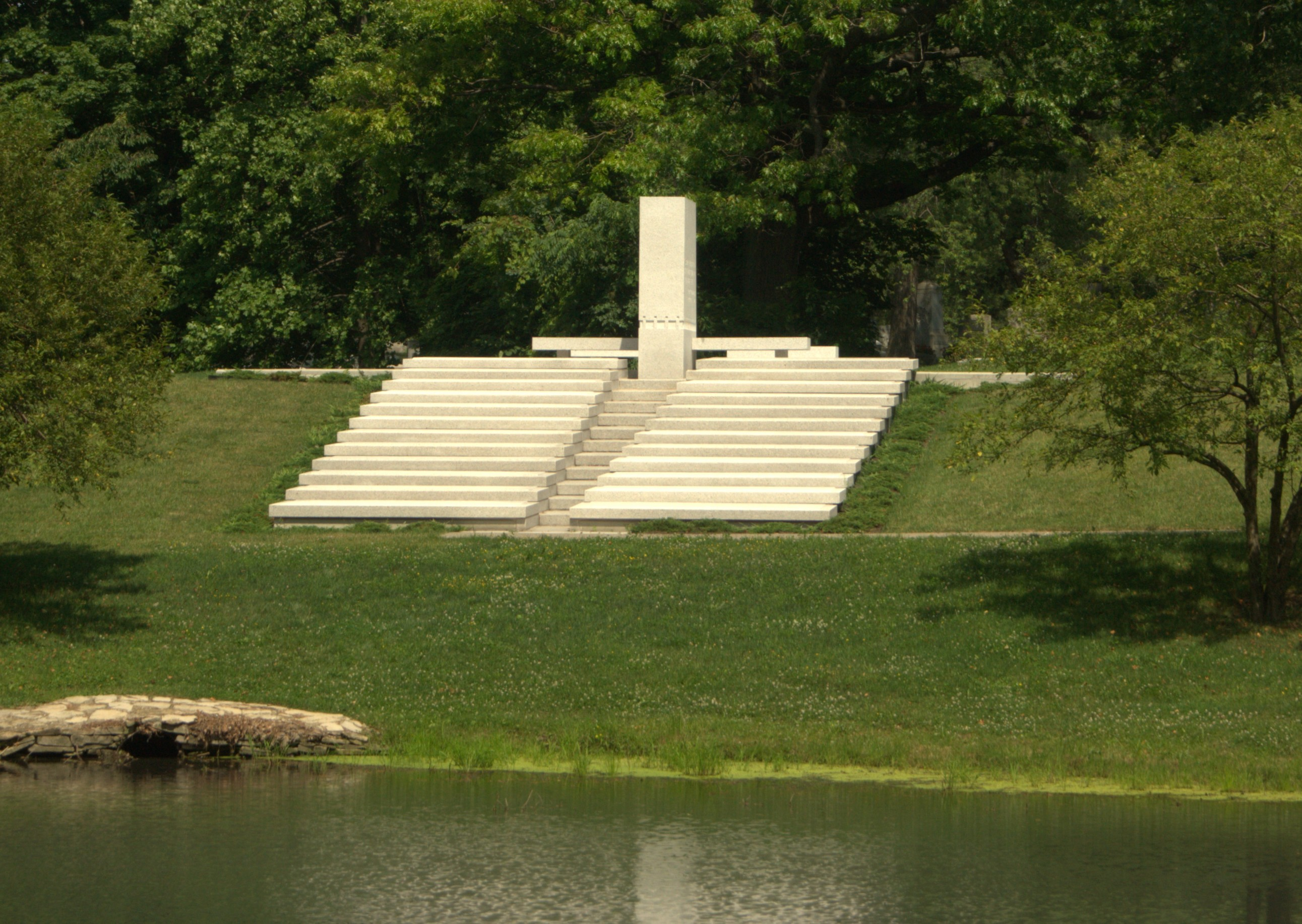
Blue Sky Mausoleum. Designed in 1928 by Frank Lloyd Wright for Darwin D. Martin. Constructed in 2004.

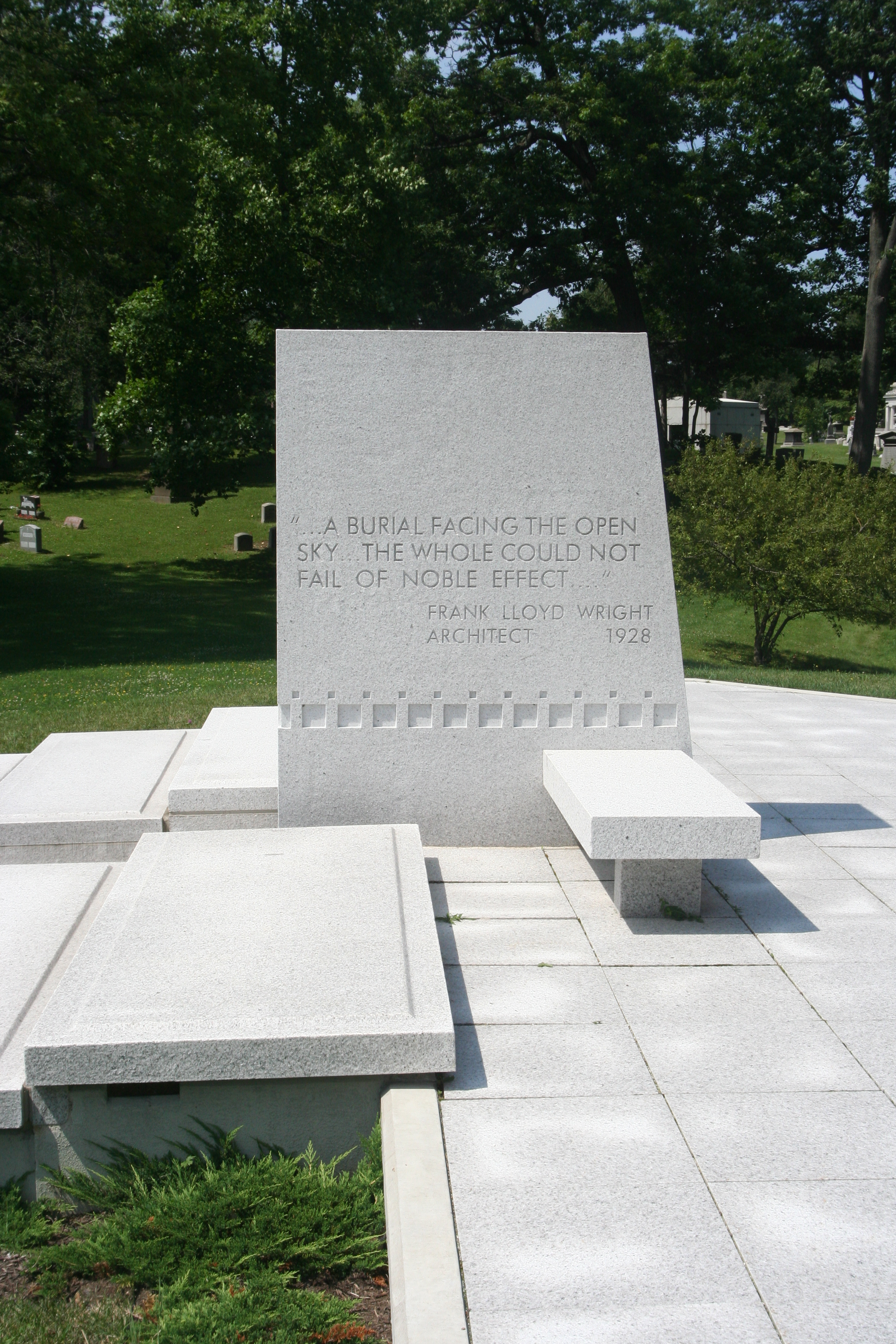
Close-Up of Blue Sky Mausoleum

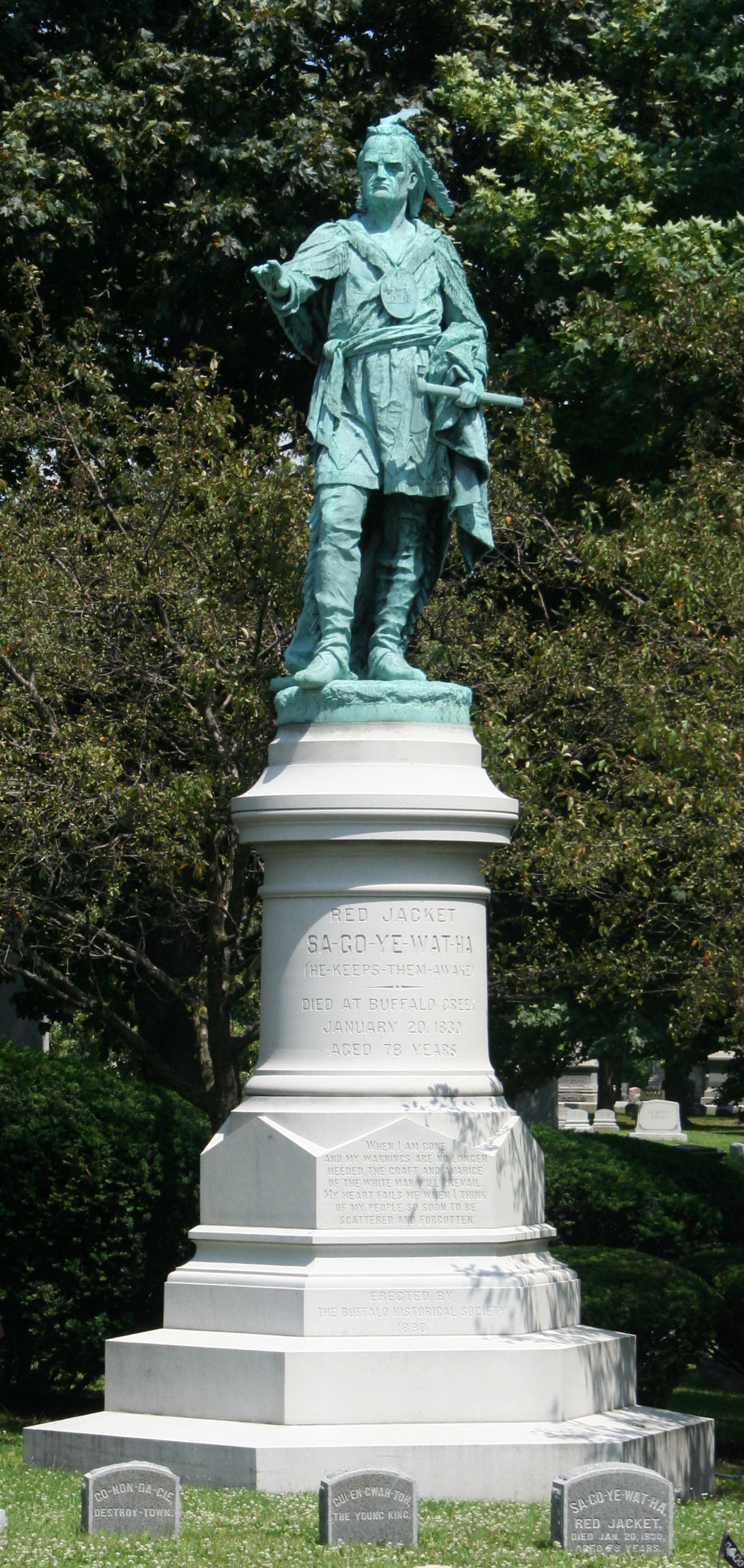
Red Jacket statue sculpted by James G. C. Hamilton, 1890.

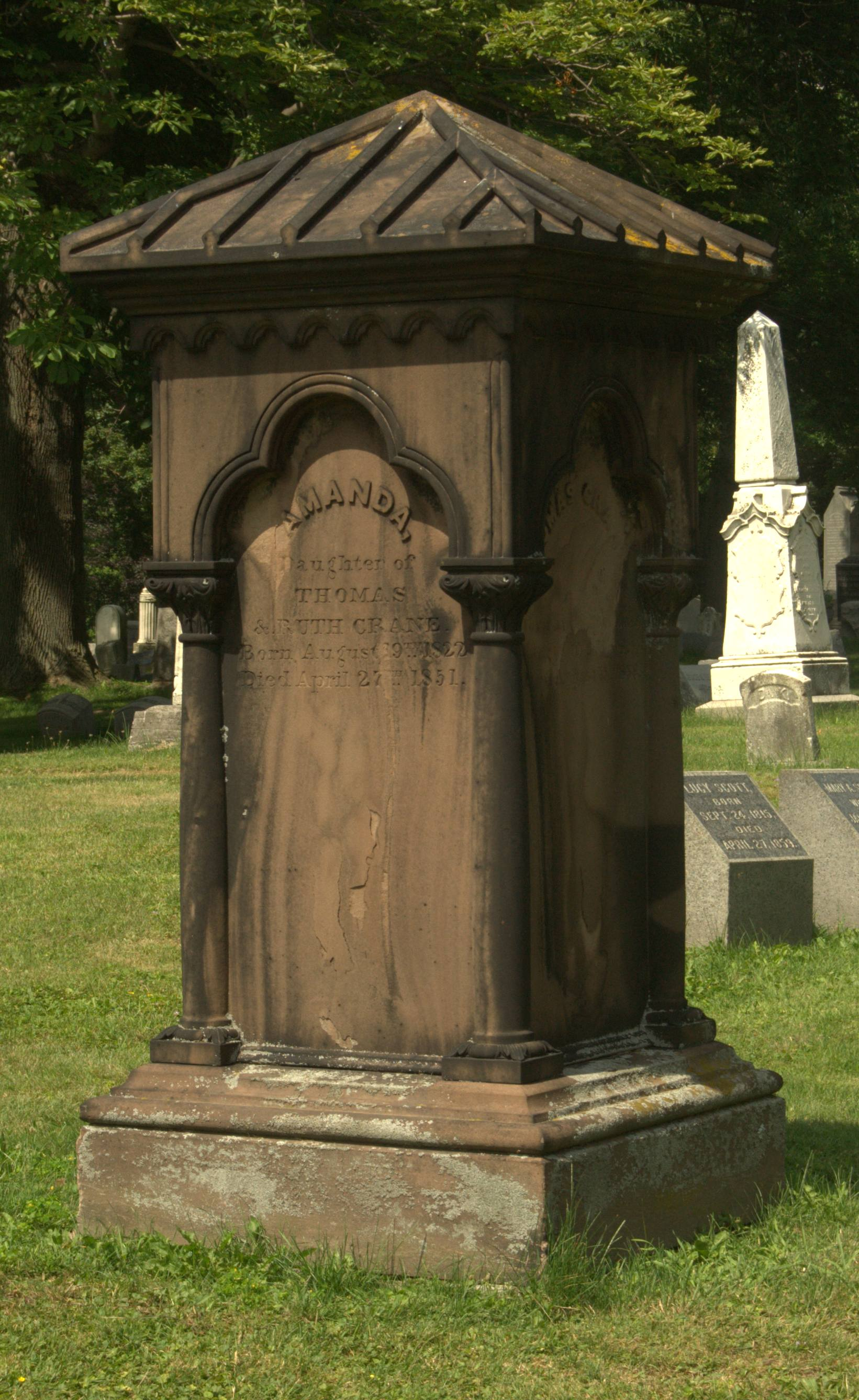
Thomas Crane Monument, 1853.

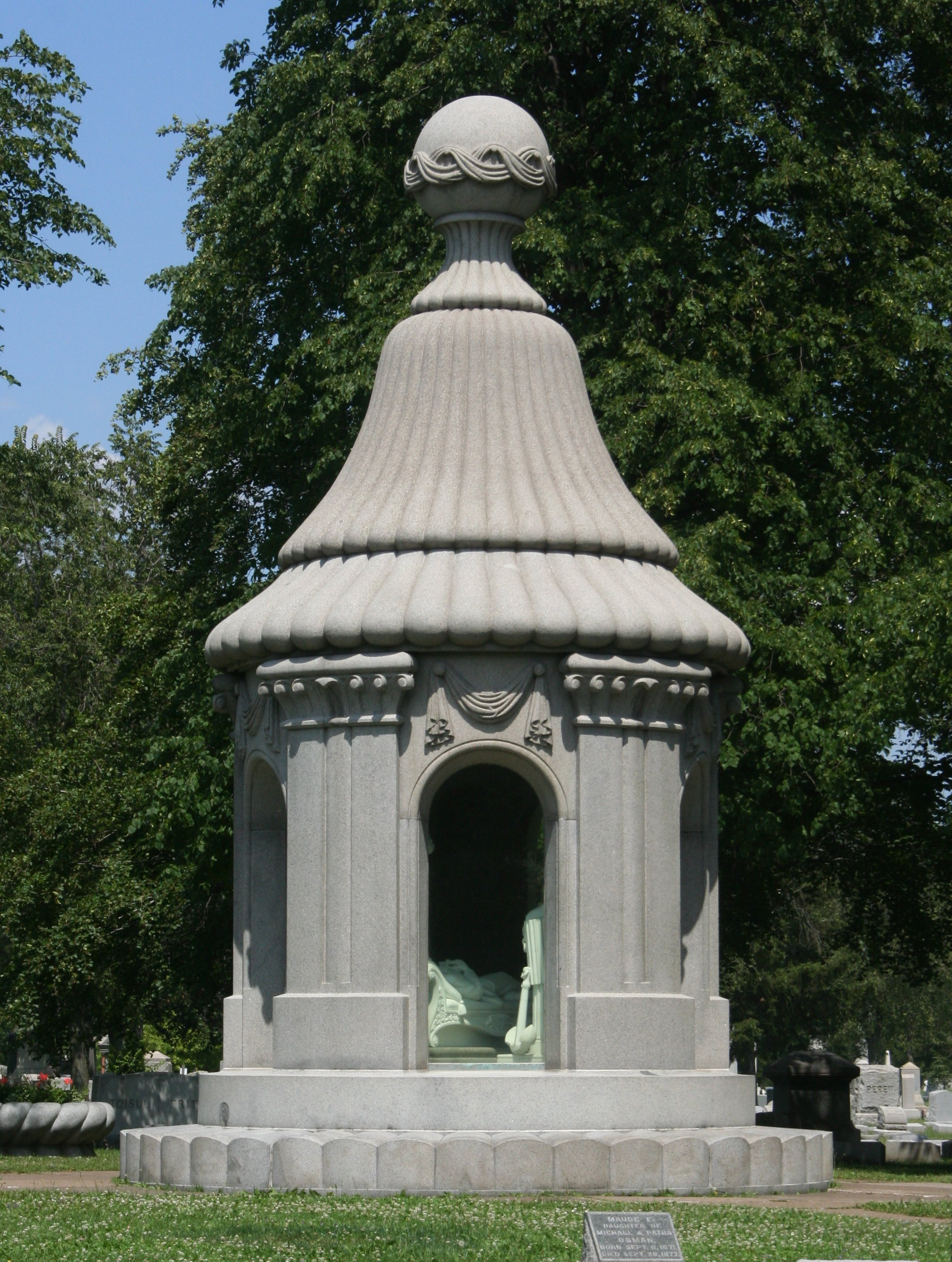
The Blocher Memorial

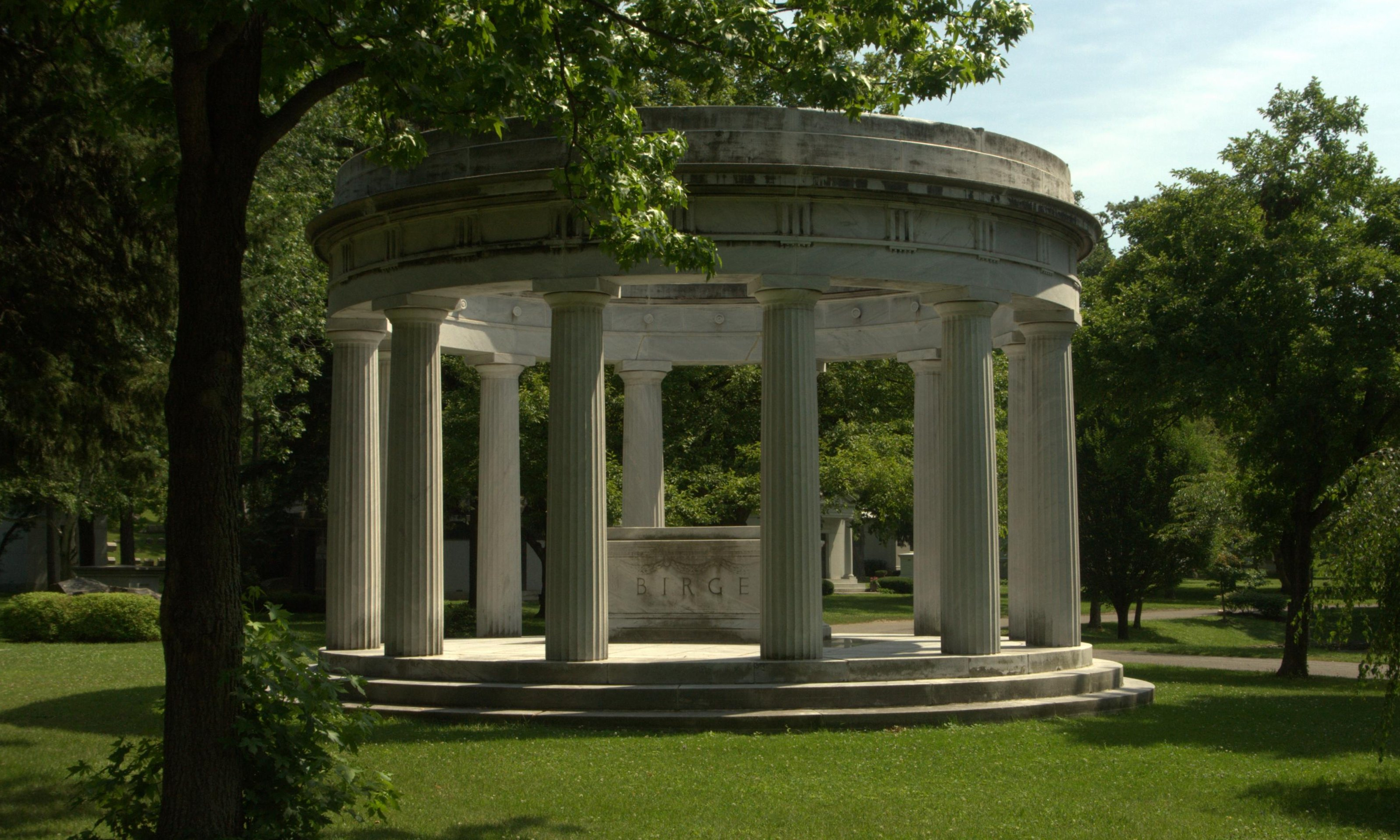
The Birge Memorial by George Cary for George K. Birge, president of the Pierce-Arrow Motor Car Company.

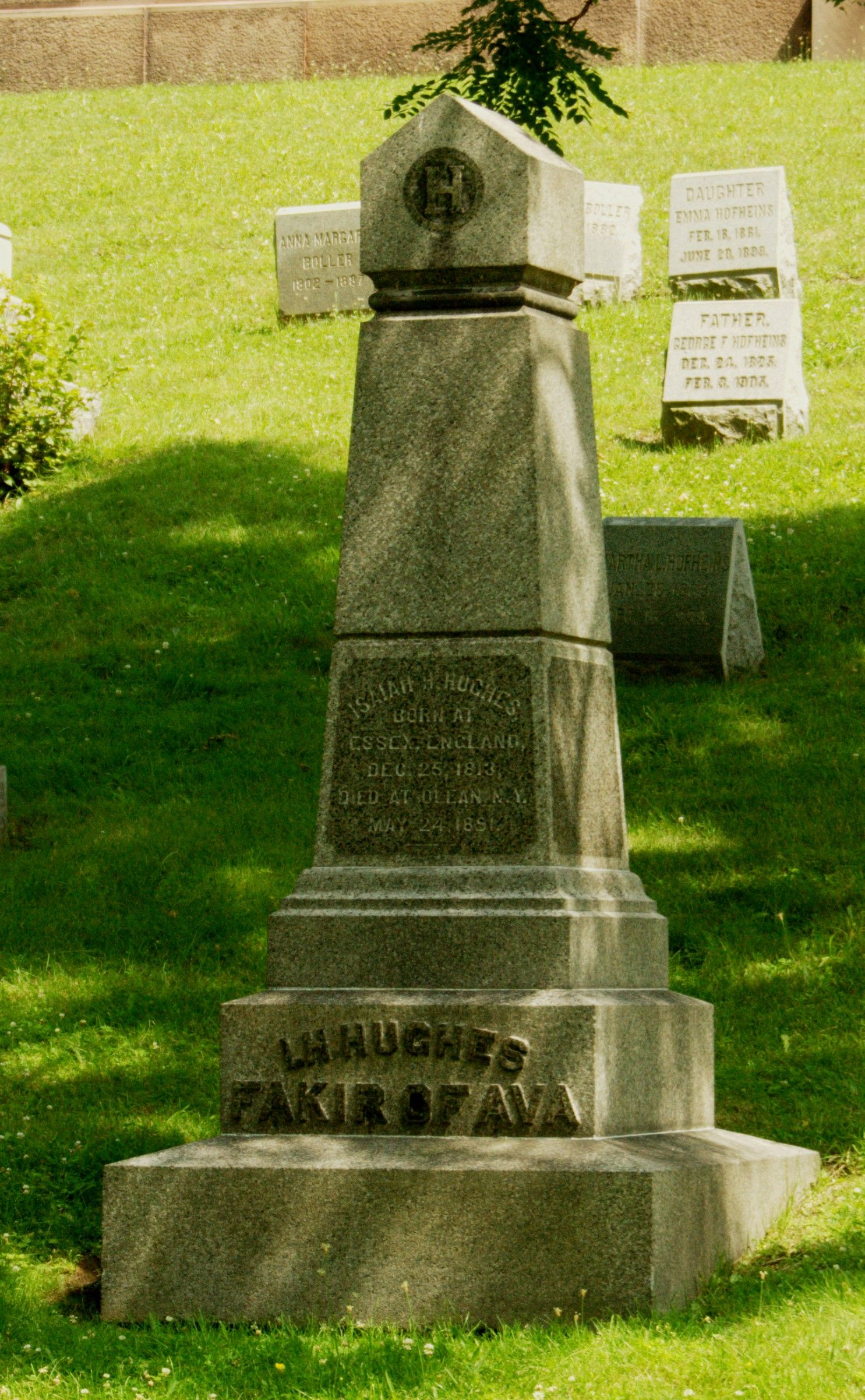
Grave of the Fakir of Ava

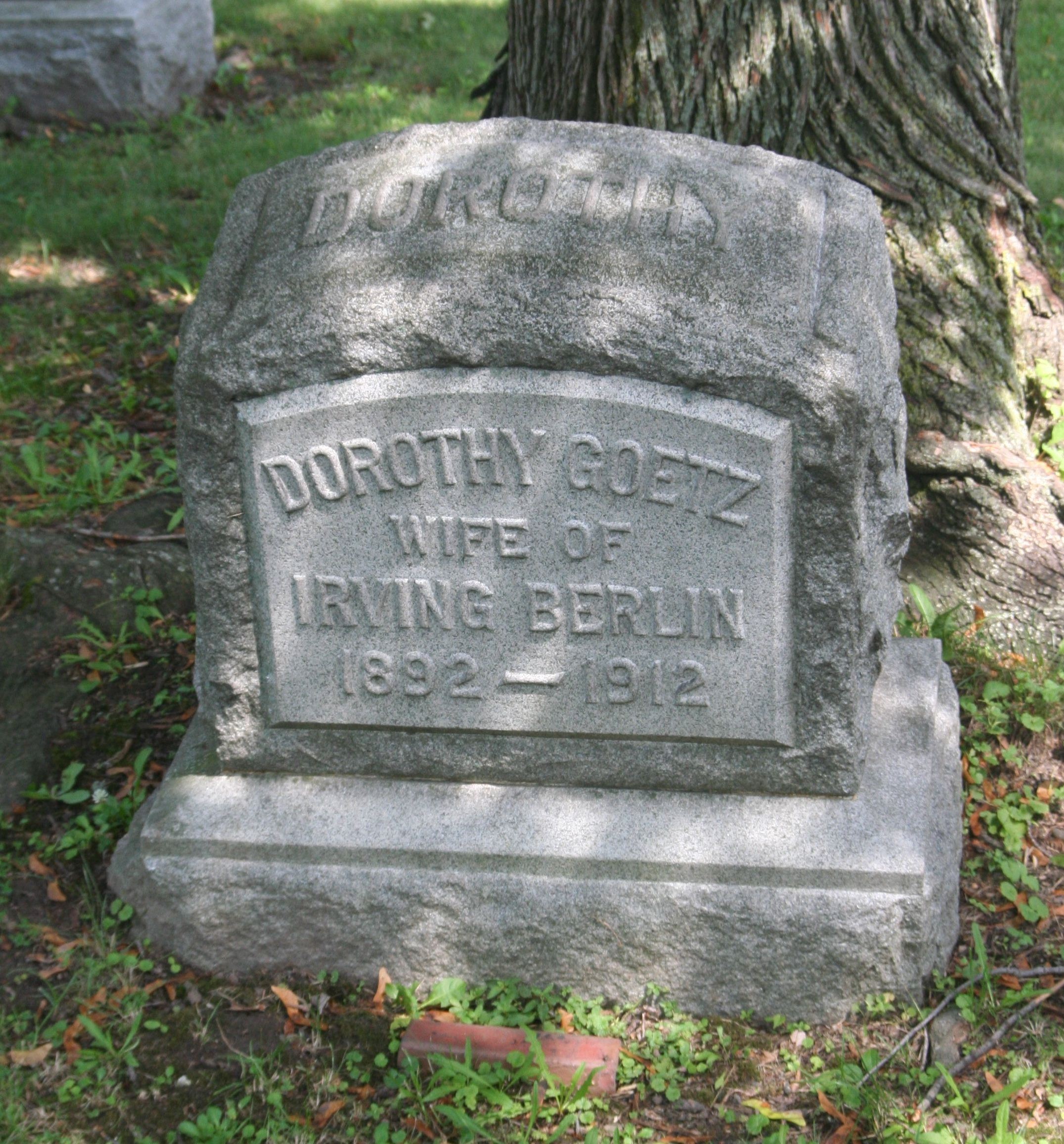
Grave of Dorothy Goetz, wife of Irving Berlin

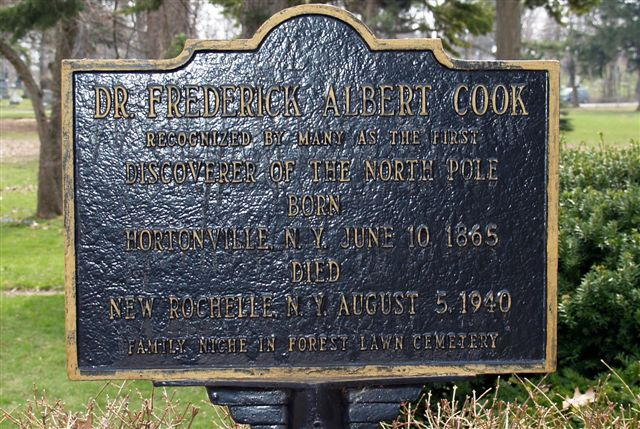
Marker for final resting place of Frederick Cook

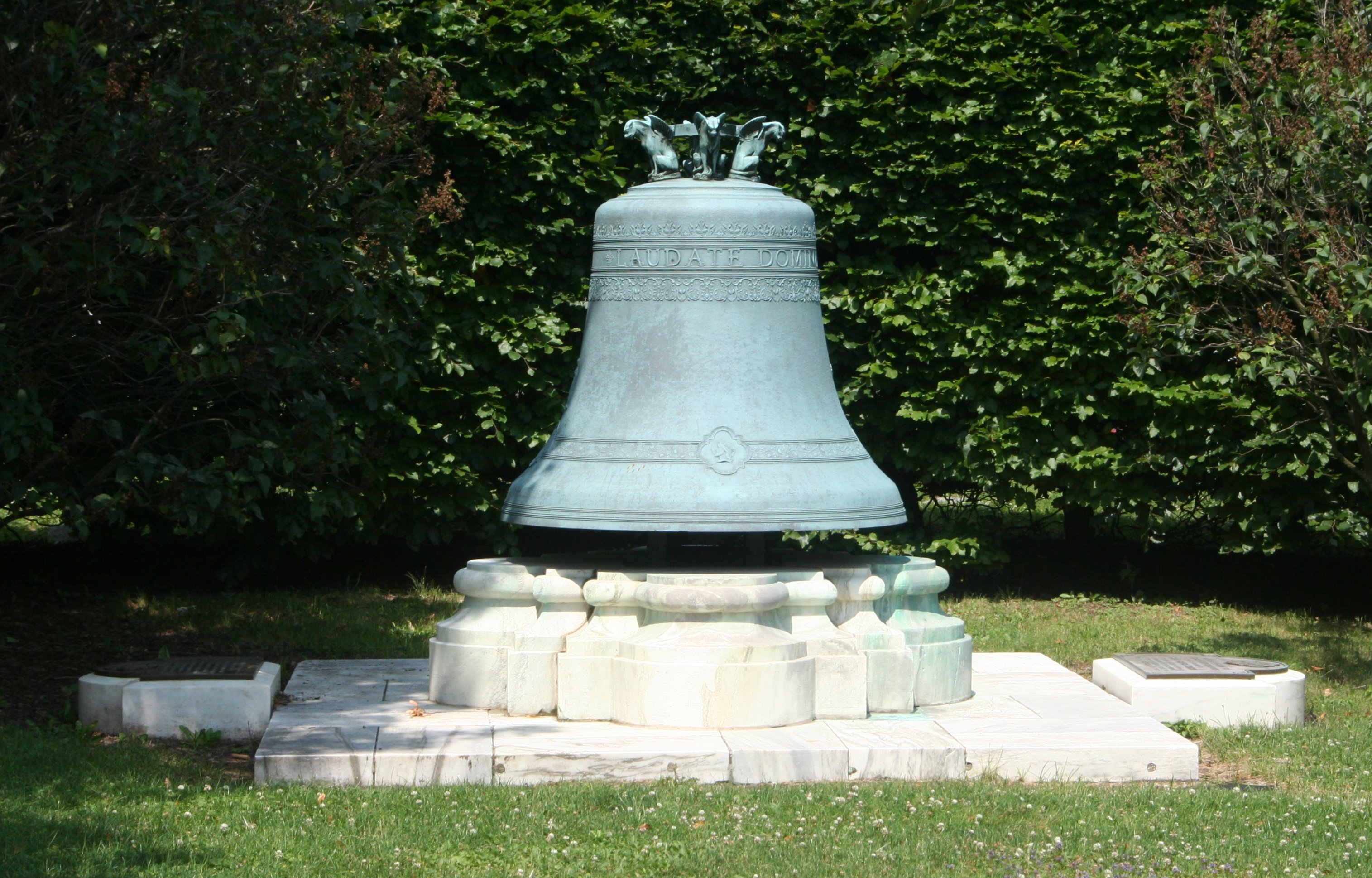
The Oishei Bell, near the entrance to the cemetery

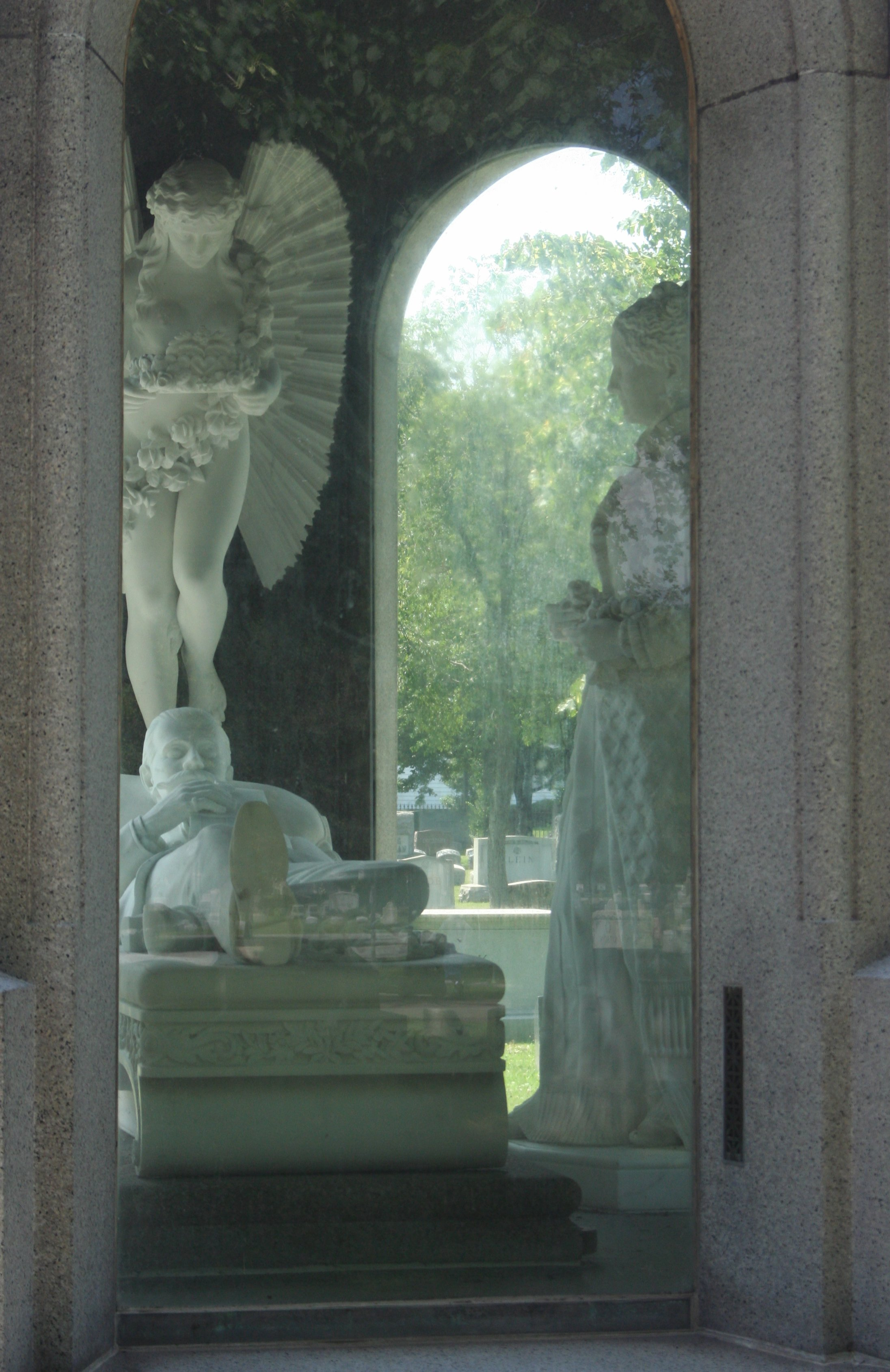
Interior of the Blocher Memorial

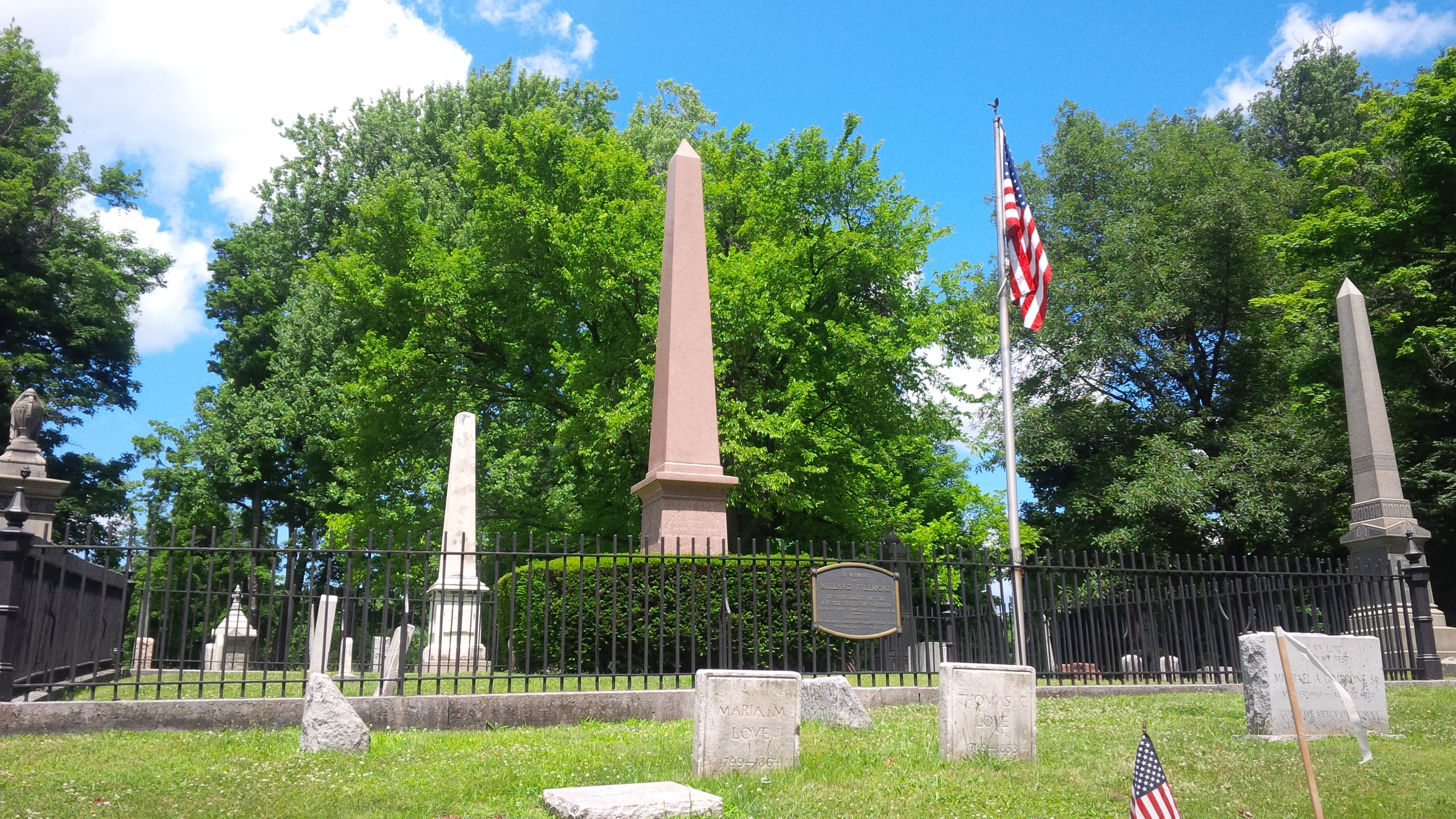
Millard Fillmore grave

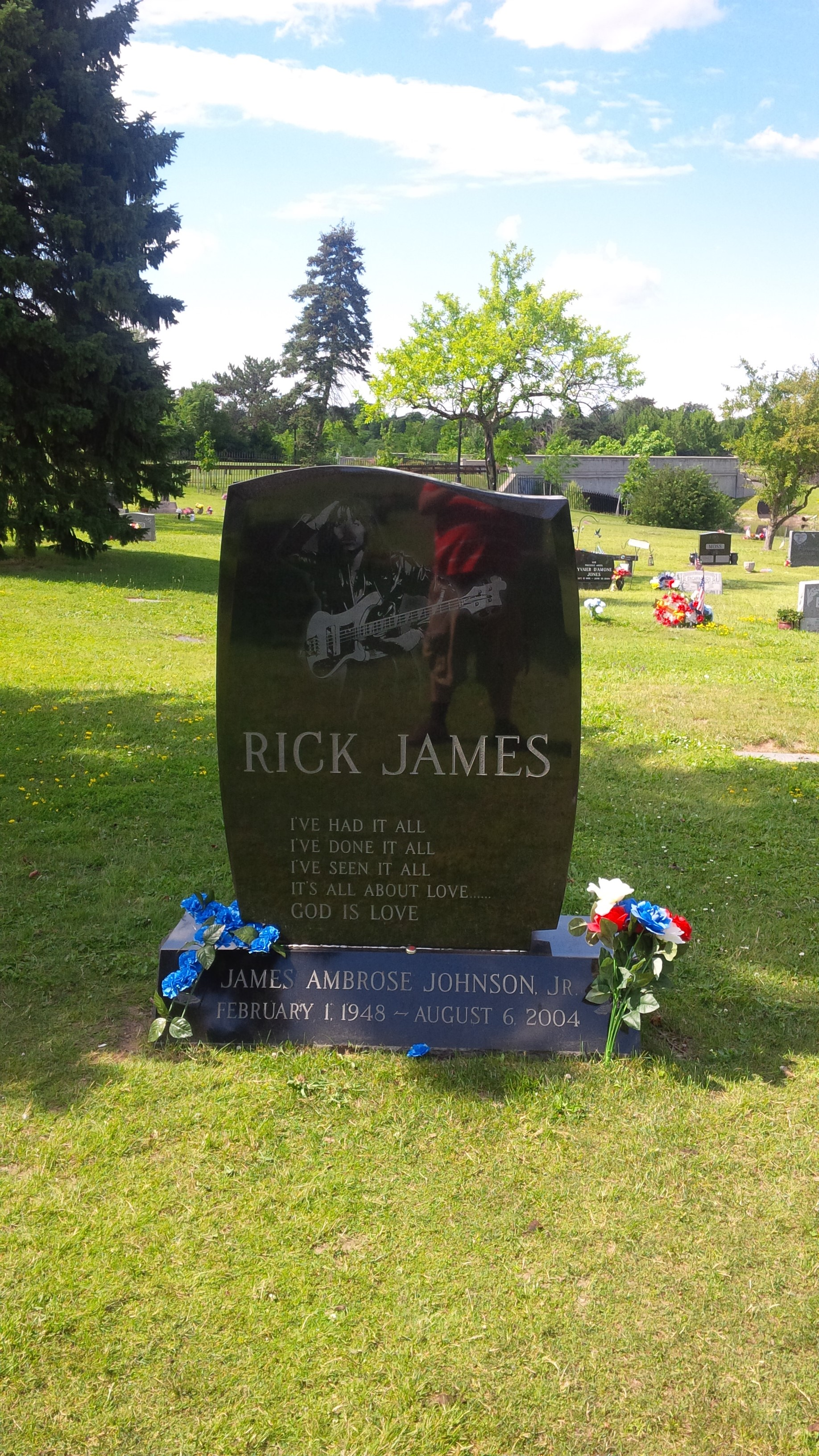
Rick James grave

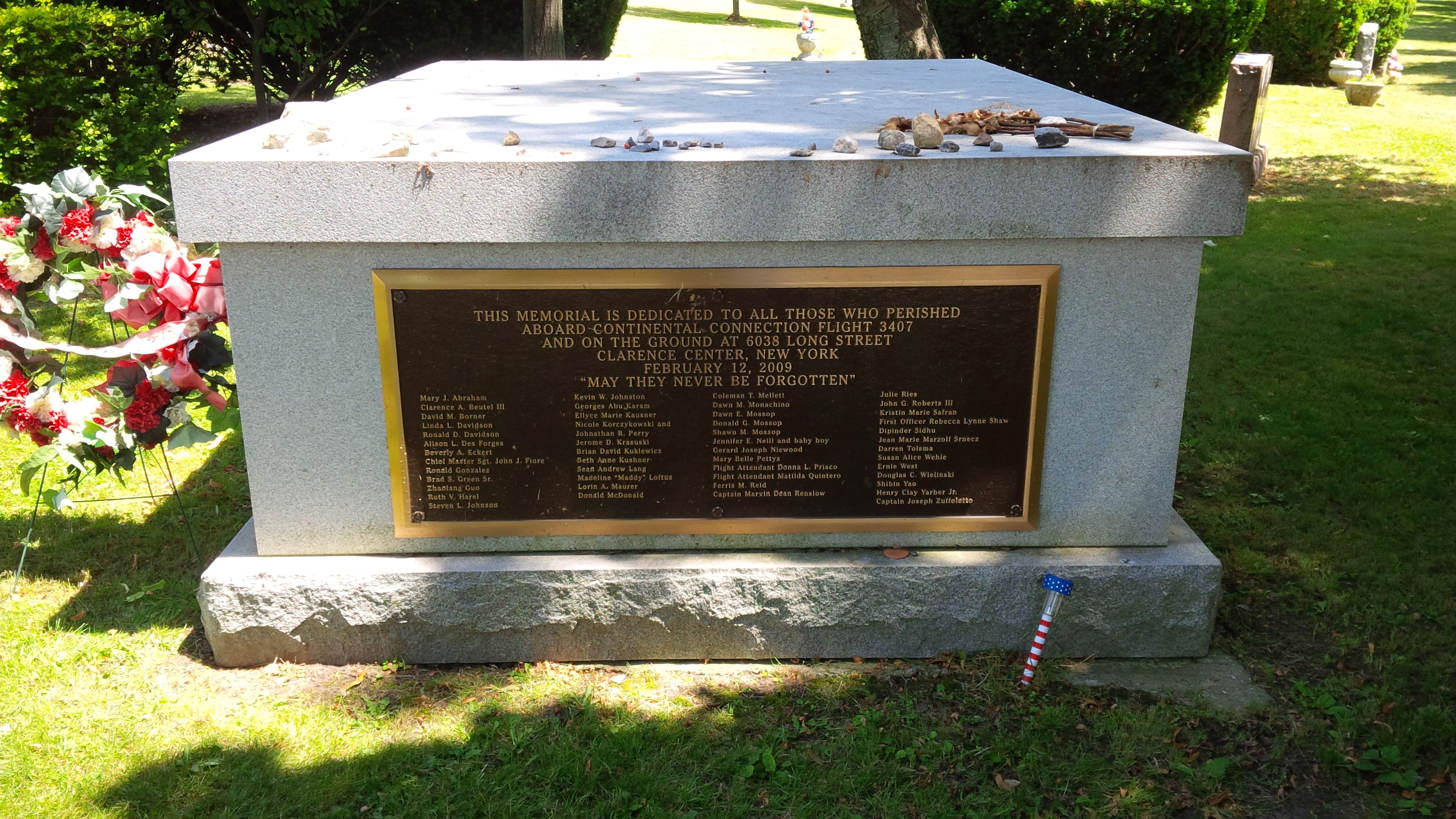
Memorial to the victims of Colgan Air Flight 3407

== Others buried here ==
- John J. Albright (1848–1931), American businessman and philanthropist
- Lewis F. Allen (1800–1890), American politician and land developer
- Major Andre Andrews (1792–1834), 2nd Mayor of Buffalo
- William Farquhar Barry (1818–1879), U.S. Civil War general
- Hiram Barton (1810–1880), Mayor of Buffalo, 1849–50, 1852–53
- Lyman K. Bass (1836–1889), member of the U.S. House of Representatives
- Philip Becker (1830–1898), Mayor of Buffalo, 1876–77, 1886–89
- Al Boasberg (1891–1937), comedy writer
- Louise Blanchard Bethune (1856–1913), first female architect
- Daniel D. Bidwell Civil War brigadier general
- John Brent, first African-American professional architect in Buffalo
- Thomas A. Budd (1818–1862), US Navy officer
- Willis Carrier, inventor of modern air conditioning
- Stephen Champlin, US Navy officer
- Shirley Chisholm, American politician, educator, and author
- George William Clinton, Mayor of Buffalo
- Eli Cook, Mayor of Buffalo, 1853, 1854–55
- Frederick Cook, explorer, physician, and ethnographer
- John W. Cudmore, surgeon and US Army major general
- Lewis P. Dayton, Mayor of Buffalo, 1874–75
- William Dorsheimer, United States Congressman and Lt. Governor of New York State
- William Fargo, Mayor of Buffalo, 1862–65, a founder of Wells Fargo and of American Express. Fargo, ND is named for him.
- Abigail Fillmore, wife of U.S. President Millard Fillmore
- Caroline C. Fillmore, second wife of U.S. President Millard Fillmore
- Barbara Siggers Franklin, mother of singer Aretha Franklin
- Dorothy Goetz, first wife of Irving Berlin
- Townsend Griffiss, first US aviator killed in Europe in World War II, 1900–1942 (cenotaph, body not recovered)
- Anna Katharine Green, American poet and novelist
- Anson Goodyear, first president of the Museum of Modern Art
- Charles W. Goodyear, co-founder of the Great Southern Lumber Company
- Nathan K. Hall, member of the U.S. House of Representatives
- Mickey Harmon (1984–2025), American artist and activist
- Samuel P. Heintzelman, Civil War major general
- E.F. "Tommy" Hughitt, 1920s NFL quarterback, politician and auto salesman
- Red Jacket, Seneca orator and chief of the Wolf clan
- Martha Jackson, art dealer, founder of the Martha Jackson Gallery
- Edwin Jaeckle, New York Republican State Chairman 1940–44
- Rick James (1948–2004), American musician and composer
- Edward Austin Kent, Buffalo architect who perished aboard the RMS Titanic (1854–1912)
- Jesse Ketchum, Canadian politician and tannery owner in Toronto and Buffalo
- William Ketchum, Mayor of Buffalo, 1844–45
- Northrup R. Knox, Founder of the Buffalo Sabres, banker and community leader
- Seymour H. Knox I, businessman, co-founder of F.W. Woolworth Company
- John D. Larkin, owner and founder of the Larkin mail order company, 1845–1926
- Stanford Lipsey (1927–2016), newspaper publisher
- Timothy T. Lockwood, Mayor of Buffalo, 1858–59
- John C. Lord, Presbyterian minister and activist
- George Maltby Love, 1831–1887 Civil War Medal of Honor Recipient
- Matthew D. Mann (1845–1921), American gynecologist who operated on President McKinley after he was shot
- Louis W. Marcus (1863–1923), Justice of the New York Supreme Court
- Mitchell Mark, pioneer of motion picture exhibition
- Darwin D. Martin, Larkin Company executive and commissioner of the Darwin D. Martin House
- Joseph G. Masten, Mayor of Buffalo, 1843–44 & 1845–46
- William McMillan, Buffalo's first Superintendent of Parks
- Henry Moxley, African-American businessman, religious leader and activist
- Albert J. Myer father of the U.S. Army Signal Corps
- Dr. Roswell Park, founder of Roswell Park Comprehensive Cancer Center
- Ely S. Parker, Seneca attorney, engineer, and tribal diplomat
- Ralph Peo, Founder of Frontier Industries, CEO & Chairman of Houdaille Industries
- Kristen Pfaff, ex-bassist of American rock band Hole
- Hiram Pratt, Mayor of Buffalo
- Bennett C. Riley, US Army General and last military Governor of California
- Charles Rohlfs, American actor, patternmaker, stove designer and furniture maker
- Charles Cary Rumsey, sculptor
- William Findlay Rogers, Mayor of Buffalo, US Representative
- Jacob F. Schoellkopf (1819—1899), industrialist
- Grace Carew Sheldon (1855–1921), American journalist, author, editor, businesswoman
- Henry K. Smith, Mayor of Buffalo, 1850–51
- Alfred P. Southwick, steam-boat engineer, dentist and inventor of the first electric chair
- Elbridge G. Spaulding, American lawyer, banker, and politician
- Stanley Spisiak, Conservationist and savior of Lake Erie
- Alfred P. Stone, member of the U.S. House of Representatives
- Mary Burnett Talbert
- Sheldon Thompson, Mayor of Buffalo
- Josiah Trowbridge, physician and Mayor of Buffalo
- George Urban Jr. (1850–1928), businessman
- Richard A. Waite, British-born American architect
- John B. Weber, Civil War colonel and United States Congressman, 1885–89
- Chandler J. Wells, Mayor of Buffalo, 1866–67
- Charles Barker Wheeler (1851–1935), New York Supreme Court justice
- John G. Wickser, New York State Treasurer, 1903–04
- Samuel Wilkeson, industrialist and Mayor of Buffalo
- Joseph Willcocks, former member of the Legislative Assembly of Upper Canada and Major in the Canadian Volunteers (US Army) during the War of 1812
- William Williams, U.S. Representative, railroad executive, banker
- Craig Lehner, Buffalo Police Officer
- 17 unidentified victims of the Angola Horror
- 11 unknown soldiers who died in hospitals in Buffalo during the Civil War

== See also ==
- List of burial places of presidents and vice presidents of the United States
