= Doctor Pierce =

Doctor Pierce may refer to:

- Hawkeye Pierce, lead fictional character of the book, film, and television series M*A*S*H
- Ray Vaughn Pierce (1840–1914), seller of patent medicines and U.S. congressman
- William Luther Pierce (1933–2002), founder of the white separatist National Alliance organization

See also Doctor Peirce:

- Bill Peirce (b. 1938), economist and 2006 Ohio gubernatorial candidate
