= Amasa Parker =

Amasa Parker may refer to:

- Amasa J. Parker (1807–1890), congressman from New York
- Amasa J. Parker Jr. (1843–1938), his son, state senator from New York and National Guard of New York general
