= James Hilton Manning =

Mayor of Albany, New York (1854–1925)

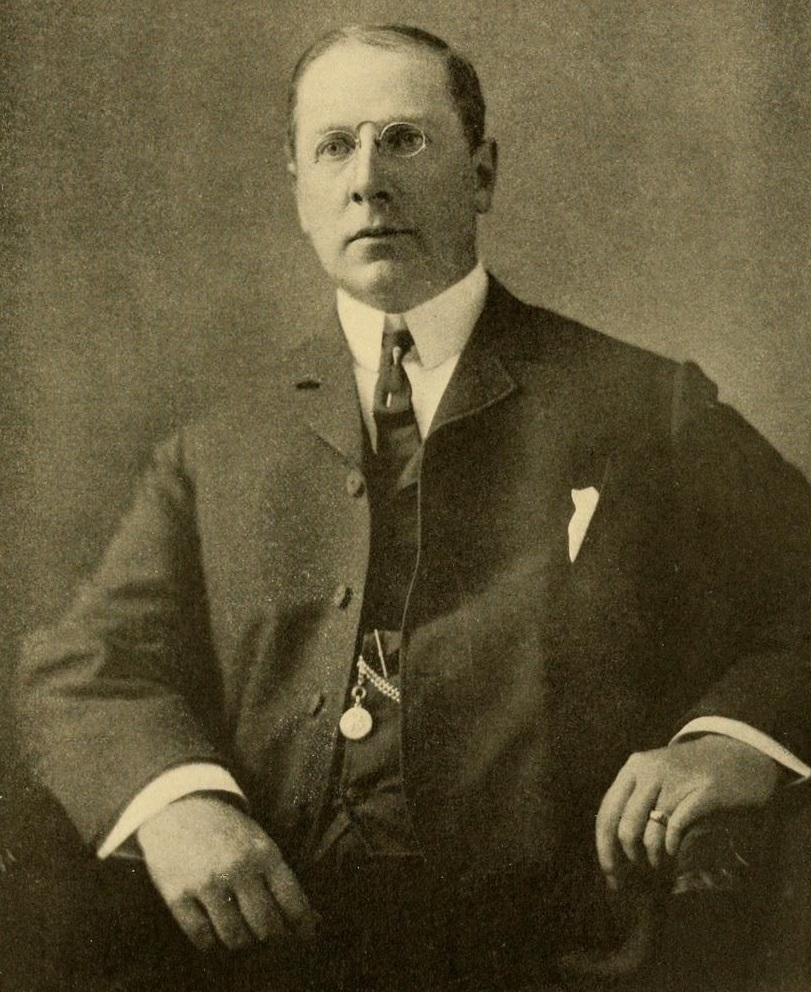
- From 1906's Albany Chronicles: A History of the City Arranged Chronologically

Mayor of Albany, New York
- In office May 5, 1890 – April 30, 1894
- Preceded by: Edward A. Maher
- Succeeded by: Oren Elbridge Wilson

Member of the New York State Civil Service Commission
- In office December 30, 1887 – December 29, 1889
- Preceded by: Augustus Schoonmaker Jr.
- Succeeded by: Alexander C. Eustace

Personal details
- Born: September 22, 1854 Albany, New York, U.S.
- Died: July 4, 1925 (aged 70) Albany, New York, U.S.
- Resting place: Albany Rural Cemetery
- Party: Democratic
- Spouse: Emma J. Austin (m. 1879–1925, his death)
- Children: 1
- Parent(s): Daniel Manning; Mary (Little) Manning
- Relatives: John B. Manning (uncle)
- Occupation: Newspaper publisher Businessman; Banker; Author
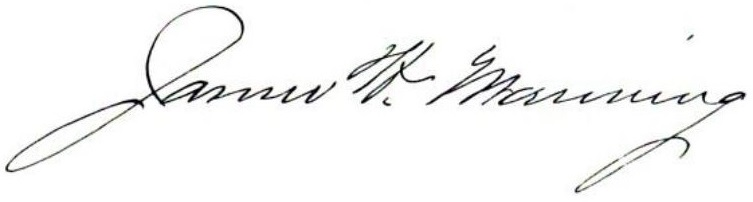
- Signature

Military service
- Allegiance: United States; New York
- Branch/service: New York National Guard
- Years of service: 1875–1911
- Rank: Major; Lieutenant Colonel (Brevet)
- Unit: 10th Infantry Regiment; 3rd Brigade

James Hilton Manning (September 22, 1854 – July 4, 1925) was an American newspaper publisher, businessman, and author from Albany, New York. A Democrat and the son of Daniel Manning, who served as the U.S. Secretary of the Treasury, Manning was most notable for his service as mayor of Albany from 1890 to 1894.

A native of Albany, Manning attended the local schools and was an 1873 graduate of Albany Free Academy (now Albany High School). He was initially employed by the Albany Argus newspaper, of which his father was publisher, and he advanced from typesetter to reporter to managing editor. He was also active in several businesses as an officer or director, including serving as president of the Weed–Parsons Printing Company, National Savings Bank of Albany and Albany District Telegraph Company.

Manning was also active in the New York National Guard beginning in 1875, and advanced from private to sergeant major before receiving his commission as a first lieutenant in 1878. He continued to serve and advance through the ranks, and he attained promotion to major and brevet lieutenant colonel before retiring in 1911.

In addition to his newspaper and business interests, Manning was a historian and author, and published six works on banking and local history between 1897 and 1917. Manning died in Albany on July 4, 1925, and was buried at Albany Rural Cemetery.

== Early life ==
James H. Manning was born in Albany, New York, on September 22, 1854, the son of Daniel Manning and Mary (Little) Manning. He attended the public schools of Albany and graduated from Albany Free Academy in 1873. At graduation, Manning received prizes for oratory and essay writing. The academy was later renamed Albany High School, and Manning served as president of its alumni association in 1882.

While in high school, Manning joined the staff of the Albany Argus newspaper, which was owned by his father. After learning typesetting in the paper's composing room, he moved to positions as a subscription clerk and reporter. From 1881 to 1883, Manning was general manager, secretary, and treasurer of the Bonsilate Button Company. In 1883, Manning became managing editor of the Argus.

Manning was also active in Albany's fraternal and civic life. Among his memberships were the city's Young Men's Association, Friendly Few, and Angler's Association. In addition, he was a Freemason, member of the Apollo Singing Society, and member of the Fort Orange Club. He was also a member of St. Paul's Episcopal Church, which he served as a vestryman. Manning also belonged to the Albany Country Club and Albany's Robert Burns Club.

== Business career ==
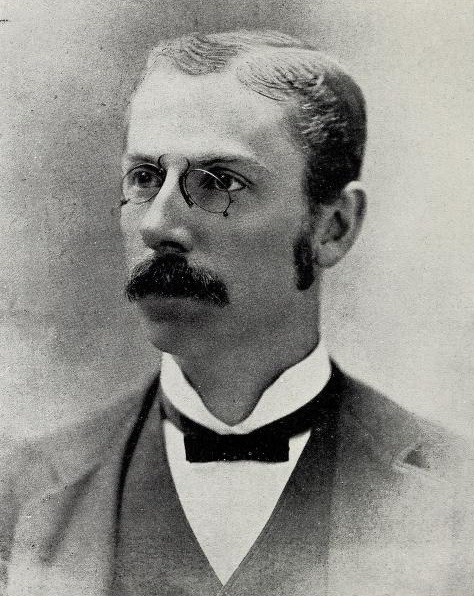
From 1891's Noted Living Albanians and State Officials

In addition to his newspaper career, Manning also pursued several business interests, including serving as president of the Weed–Parsons Printing Company. In addition, he served as president of Albany's National Savings Bank and the Albany District Telegraph Company. He also served on the board of directors for several companies, including the Albany and Susquehanna Railroad, Park Bank, National Commercial Bank, United Traction Company, Consolidated Car Heating Company, and Hudson River Telephone Company, of which he was also a vice president.

As Manning's career continued, he served as a director or officer of several other companies, including Albany's Union Trust Company, New York City's Title Guaranty & Trust Company, and New York Telephone Company. He also served a term as president of the Savings Banks Association of the State of New York. Manning also created a charitable foundation, the James Hilton Manning and Emma Austin Manning Foundation, which provided grants to facilitate medical research.

== Military career ==
In 1875, Manning began a career in the New York National Guard when he enlisted in Albany's Company A, 10th Infantry Regiment, also known as the Albany Zouave Cadets. He was appointed regimental sergeant major in 1877, and received his commission as a first lieutenant in 1878. Manning was later promoted to captain, and he received promotion to major in 1891. His assignments included commissary officer on the staff of the 10th Infantry, and ordnance officer and commissary officer on the staff of the 3rd Brigade. He received brevet promotion to lieutenant colonel in 1907, and retired in 1911.

== Political career ==
Manning was active in politics as a Democrat, and served on the New York State Civil Service Commission from 1887 to 1889. In April 1890, Manning was elected mayor of Albany by defeating Republican Howard N. Fuller. He was reelected over Republican James M. Warner in April 1892. Manning served from May 5, 1890, to April 30, 1894, and did not run for election to a third term. As mayor, Manning's initiatives focused on expansion of the public school system, including completion of Public Schools 10 (1890), 6 (1892), 4 (1893), and 24 (1894).

== Career as author ==
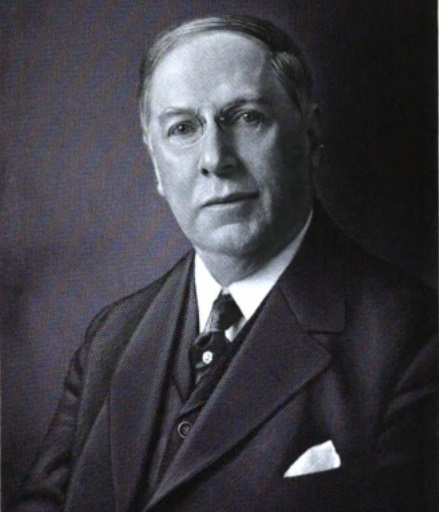
From 1917's Century of American Savings Banks

Manning was an author and historian. Among the historical artifacts he collected were autographs and Native American relics, and his autograph collection was sold after his death. Among the rare signatures he acquired were those of Thomas Lynch Jr. and Button Gwinnett.

In addition to items of historical interest, Manning also authored several works on banking and history, including:

- The Albany Railway: History from Date of Its Organization (1897)
- New York State Men: Biographic Studies and Character Portraits (1906)
- Albany Zouave Cadets: Fifty Years Young (1910)
- New York State Men (1914)
- New York State Women (1914)
- Century of American Savings Banks (1917)

== Death and burial ==
As chairman of Albany's Defense Day Committee, (Note: Defense Day, or Defense Test Day, was a 1924 nationwide event created as a way for Americans to demonstrate patriotism and a willingness to fight for the nation if circumstances required. Activities included parades, speeches, and other public displays of patriotism.) Manning was marching in the city's Independence Day parade on July 4, 1925, when he suffered a fatal heart attack. He was buried at Albany Rural Cemetery.

== Family ==
In October 1879, Manning married Emma J. Austin (1860–1934). They were the parents of a daughter, Beatrice (1885–1956). Beatrice Austin Manning was married to Charles Irving Oliver from 1909 until their 1918 divorce. In 1934, she married John Henderson Servis, who changed his name to Manning.

Manning's uncle, John B. Manning, served as mayor of Buffalo.

== Electoral history ==
Manning was the Albany Democratic Party's unanimous nominee for mayor in 1890 and 1892.

General Election results:

Mayoral election, April 8, 1890. Total votes, 19,876.

- James Hilton Manning, (Democrat), 13,552 (68.1%)
- Howard N. Fuller (Republican), 6,316 (31.8%)
- Scattering, 8 (0.1%)

Mayoral election, April 12, 1892. Total votes, 20,339.

- James Hilton Manning (Democratic), 12,781 (62.8%)
- James M. Warner (Republican), 7,528 (37.0%)
- Scattering, 30 (0.2%)

== Notes ==
Political offices
Preceded by Edward A. Maher	Mayor of Albany, New York; 1890–1894	Succeeded by Oren Elbridge Wilson
