= John Boyd Thacher =

American politician

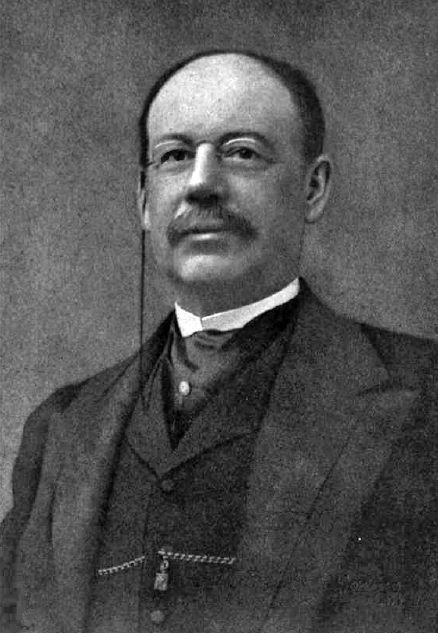

Mayor of Albany, New York
- In office January 1, 1896 – December 31, 1897
- Preceded by: Oren Elbridge Wilson
- Succeeded by: Thomas J. Van Alstyne
- In office January 1, 1886 – December 31, 1888
- Preceded by: A. Bleecker Banks
- Succeeded by: Edward A. Maher

Member of the New York State Senate from the 17th District
- In office January 1, 1884 – December 31, 1885
- Preceded by: Abraham Lansing
- Succeeded by: Amasa J. Parker Jr.

Personal details
- Born: September 11, 1847 Ballston, New York, U.S.
- Died: February 25, 1909 (aged 61) Albany, New York, U.S.
- Resting place: Albany Rural Cemetery
- Party: Democratic
- Spouse: Emma Treadwell
- Relatives: John Boyd Thacher II (nephew); Ebby Thacher (nephew)
- Education: Williams College
- Occupation: Businessman; Author

John Boyd Thacher (September 11, 1847 – February 25, 1909) was a businessman and politician from Albany, New York. The son of a former mayor of Albany, Thacher served in the New York State Senate from 1884 to 1885 and was mayor of Albany from 1886 to 1888 and again from 1896 to 1897.

A native of Ballston, New York, Thacher was raised in Albany and educated primarily by private tutors. He then attended Williams College, from which he graduated cum laude in 1869 with a Bachelor of Arts degree. Williams later awarded Thacher his Master of Arts as in course. After graduation, Thacher joined his father's business manufacturing railroad car wheels. A Democrat in politics, Thacher served in the state senate from 1884 to 1885. He was Albany's mayor from 1886 to 1888 and 1896 to 1897. A supporter of hard money during the 1890s debate over U.S. monetary policy, in 1896, he won the Democratic nomination for governor of New York. William Jennings Bryan, a supporter of free silver, won the party's presidential nomination, and most statewide Democratic nominees that year were supporters of free silver, so Thacher declined to run.

Thacher was a historian and authored several books and articles on topics related to U.S. history. As a collector of historical memorabilia, he acquired numerous autographs of prominent figures, including every signer of the United States Declaration of Independence. A philanthropist, among his gifts was a large tract of land in rural Albany County, which was later added to the state's parklands as John Boyd Thacher State Park.

In 1872, Thacher married Emma Treadwell, the great-granddaughter of Connecticut governor John Treadwell. Among his family members were nephews John Boyd Thacher II, who served as mayor of Albany, and Ebby Thacher, who played an important role in Bill Wilson's creation of Alcoholics Anonymous. Thacher died in Albany, and was buried at Albany Rural Cemetery.

== Early life ==
John Boyd Thacher was born in Ballston, New York on September 11, 1847, the son of George Hornell Thacher and Ursula Jane (Boyd) Thacher. The Thachers were descended from Thomas Thacher, the first minister of Boston's Old South Church. George Thacher operated a foundry and operated a successful business manufacturing wheels and undercarriages for railroad cars, and was the primary supplier to the New York Central Railroad. In addition, he served as Albany's mayor from 1860 to 1862, 1866 to 1868, and 1870 to 1874.

John Thacher was educated primarily by private tutors before enrolling at Williams College. He graduated cum laude with a Bachelor of Arts degree in 1869. He then completed a course of practical instruction at Folsome’s Business College (later Albany Business College), then joined his father's business. Thacher was a member of the Kappa Alpha Society, and Williams later awarded him his Master of Arts degree "as in course." After the death of their father in 1887, Thacher and his brother George Hornell Thacher (1851–1929) succeeded to ownership of the business.

Thacher was a Freemason, and attained the 33rd degree of the Scottish Rite. As part of his work as a historian, Thacher amassed a library of Masonic literature, which he donated to Albany's Masters Lodge No. 5.

In 1872, Thacher married Emma Treadwell (1850–1927). They were married until his death and had no children. Thacher's family also included nephews John Boyd Thacher II and Ebby Thacher, the sons of his brother George.

== Political career ==
=== State senator ===
Thacher was active in politics as a Democrat and served as a member of Albany's board of health. In 1883, he was elected to the New York State Senate, and he served from January 1884 to December 1885. In the senate, he secured funding for completing construction of the New York State Capitol, which had begun in 1867, and was completed in 1899. He also secured social reforms including regulations for tenements, and an 1885 statewide census that enabled reapportionment of state legislative districts.

Upon becoming president in 1869, Ulysses S. Grant retired from the army. During Grant's final illness in 1884 he was in financial distress, and Thacher introduced a legislative resolution calling on New York's congressional delegation to enact a law restoring Grant to the army's retired list so he would qualify for a pension. The resolution passed, and Thacher traveled to Washington, D.C. to personally lobby members of Congress, who passed the law in early 1885.

=== Mayor of Albany ===
Thacher served as Albany's mayor from 1886 to 1888 and again from 1896 to 1898. During his first term, Thacher presided over extensive ceremonies to celebrate the bicentennial of Albany's 1686 chartering as a city. In February 1888, he organized and presided over a three day long winter carnival, the first celebration of its type south of Montreal. During his second term, Thacher oversaw the start of several construction projects, most notably Union Station at the corner of Broadway and Steuben Street.

When the kidnapping of a five-year-old boy took place in August 1897, while the city's police chief was on vacation, Thacher acted as chief for several days as the crime was investigated and searchers attempted to locate the victim. The kidnapped boy was recovered by searchers several days later, and the three kidnappers were each sentenced to fourteen years in prison.

In 1890, Thacher was appointed a commissioner from New York for the 1893 World's Columbian Exposition, and he served until 1895. During this service, he was appointed chairman of the exposition's executive committee on awards. Thacher served without pay, and at the close of the exposition, New York's governor and the presidential administration of Benjamin Harrison requested him to submit a request for reimbursement of his expenses, which he declined to do.

Thacher supported hard money and the gold standard during the 1890s debate over U.S. monetary policy. In 1896, he was chosen by the state Democratic convention as the party's nominee for governor of New York. Free silver supporter William Jennings Bryan won the party's presidential nomination, and most statewide Democratic nominees that year were supporters of free silver, so Thacher declined to run.

== Historian ==
Thacher was a historian who specialized in the early history of the Americas and the United States. His historical works included:

- The Continent of America, Its Discovery and Its Baptism; An Essay on the Nomenclature of the Old Continents, etc. (1896)
- A drama, Charlecote: or the Trial of William Shakespeare (1896)
- The Cabotian Discovery (1897)
- Christopher Columbus, His Life, His Works, His Remains, together with an Essay on Peter Martyr of Anghera and Bartolomé de las Casas, the first Historians of America (two volumes, 1903)
- Outlines of the French Revolution told in Autographs (1905)

== Death and burial ==
Thacher died in Albany on February 25, 1909. He was buried at Albany Rural Cemetery.

== Legacy ==
=== Memorabilia collections ===
Thacher was a collector of historical memorabilia. Among his collections were:

- The signatures of all the signers of the Declaration of Independence
- Early maps of the Americas.
- Material pertaining to the French Revolution
- Autographs of prominent individuals
- Rare books

After Thacher's death, his wife donated most of his collections to the Smithsonian Institution.

=== Thacher Park ===
Thacher purchased a large plot of land in central Albany County, New York which his widow donated to the state in 1914, and is now known as John Boyd Thacher State Park.

New York State Senate
Preceded by Abraham Lansing	New York State Senate; 17th District; 1884–1885	Succeeded by Amasa J. Parker Jr.
Political offices
Preceded by Oren Elbridge Wilson	Mayor of Albany, New York; 1896–1897	Succeeded by Thomas J. Van Alstyne
Preceded by Anthony Bleecker Banks	Mayor of Albany, New York; 1886–1888	Succeeded by Edward A. Maher
