= Thomas Kirby Van Zandt =

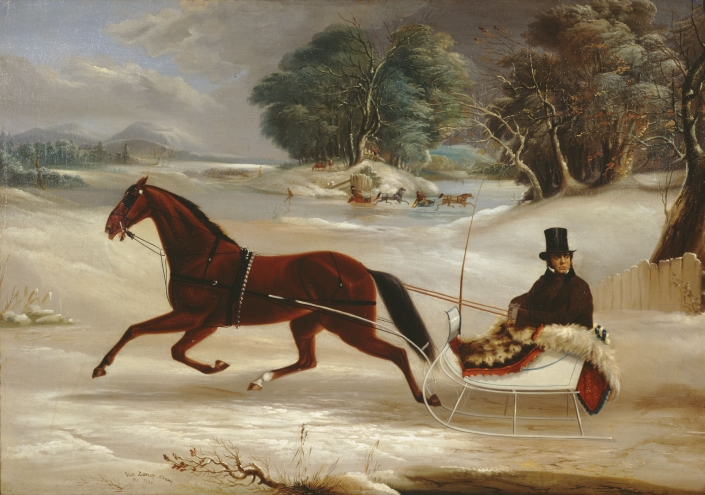
Judge Van Aernum in his Sleigh by Thomas Kirby Van Zandt, 1855

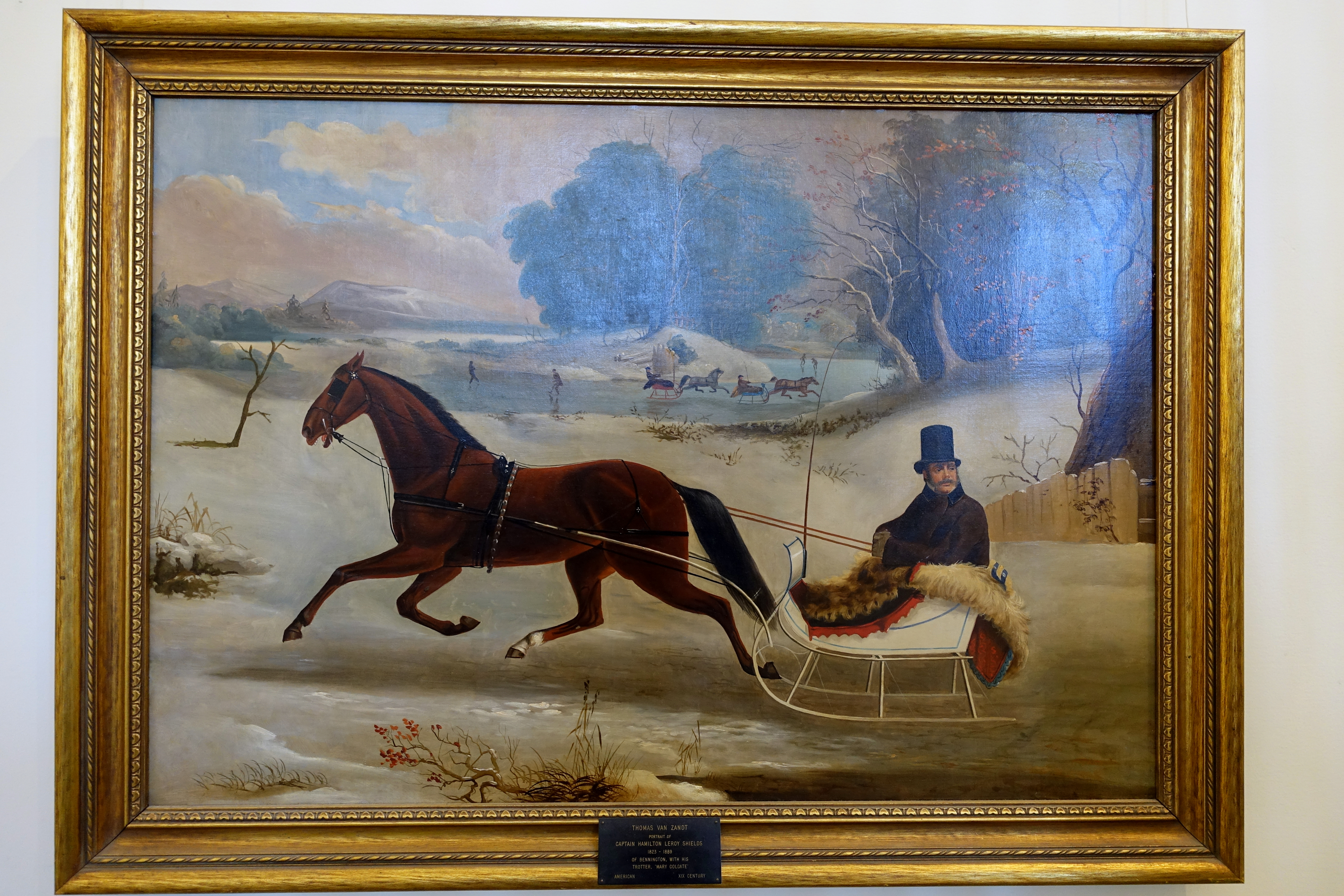
Captain Hamilton Leroy Shields of Bennington, with his trotter Mary Colgate

Thomas Kirby Van Zandt (March 7, 1814 - January 2, 1886) was a painter active in the Albany, New York region. He is remembered for his paintings of race horses for owners including Leland Stanford, Erastus Corning, and Eli Whitney, but also painted bust-length portraits of Albany citizens, dogs, and other animals. It has been hypothesized (see Ione) that Van Zandt traced his horse figures from lantern projections of Eadweard Muybridge's celebrated photographs. Van Zandt is buried in the Albany Rural Cemetery in Menands, New York.
