= John Boyd Thacher II =

American politician (1882–1957)

- Born: John Boyd Thacher II; October 26, 1882; Leadville, Colorado, U.S.
- Died: April 25, 1957 (aged 74); Albany, New York, U.S.
- Resting place: Albany Rural Cemetery
- Education: The Albany Academy; Bachelor of Arts from Princeton University; Doctor of Laws from Union College
- Occupations: lawyer, politician
- Known for: Mayor of Albany (1927-1940)
- Parent(s): George Hornell Thacher II, Emma Louise Bennett
- Family: Ebby Thacher (brother) [recognized as Alcoholics Anonymous co-founder Bill Wilson's sponsor]; John Boyd Thacher (uncle); George Hornell Thacher (grandfather)

John Boyd Thacher II (October 26, 1882 – April 25, 1957) was the Mayor of Albany, New York from 1926 to 1941. He was the nephew of Albany mayor John Boyd Thacher and grandson of another Albany mayor, George H. Thacher. Thacher was the brother of Ebby Thacher, who brought Bill Wilson into the Oxford Group, which was the model for Wilson's Alcoholics Anonymous.

== Early ==
John Boyd Thacher II was born in Leadville, Colorado to the younger George H. Thacher (son of Mayor Thacher) and Emma Louise Bennett, who spent the early 1880s on business in Colorado. The Thachers returned to Albany while John was a toddler and George Thacher re-established ties with his father's Albany business. John Thacher attended The Albany Academy and received a Bachelor of Arts degree from Princeton University in 1904. He graduated with a Doctor of Laws from Union College in 1906 and was admitted to the New York state bar association. He practiced law in Schoharie County for a year before returning to practice in Albany. He married Lulu Abel Cameron of Middle Bridge on June 17, 1918.

== WWI ==
World War I interrupted Thacher's law practice when he saw action in the Air corps and Ambulance corps, with a considerable amount of his time spent in France. Thacher then ventured into Albany government, becoming a member of the Common Council of Albany as well as city treasurer.

== Mayor ==
On March 4, 1926, Albany mayor William Stormont Hackett was killed in a car accident in Cuba. John Boyd Thacher II was named as his temporary successor. That November, he was officially elected mayor in a landslide. Thacher was reelected as mayor in 1929, 1933, and 1937. In 1932, he was nominated as a Democratic candidate for Governor of New York, but yielded to Herbert H. Lehman, who was elected.

Thacher resigned from his position as mayor in 1940 to become Judge of Albany County's Children's Court, a position he held until 1947. A long-term advocate for education and children's rights, he was also instrumental in developing the summer camp that came to bear his name: Camp Thacher.

Upon Thacher's resignation as mayor, President of the Common Council Herman F. Hoogkamp was appointed acting mayor in 1940 and served out the remainder of Thacher's term. In 1941, Erastus Corning II was elected mayor; Corning served for over 40 years until his death in 1983.

== Death ==
John Boyd Thacher II died in 1957 in Albany, and is interred in Albany Rural Cemetery.

Political offices
Preceded by William Stormont Hackett	Mayor of Albany, New York; 1927–1940	Succeeded by Herman F. Hoogkamp (acting)
