= Oren Elbridge Wilson =

Mayor of Albany, New York

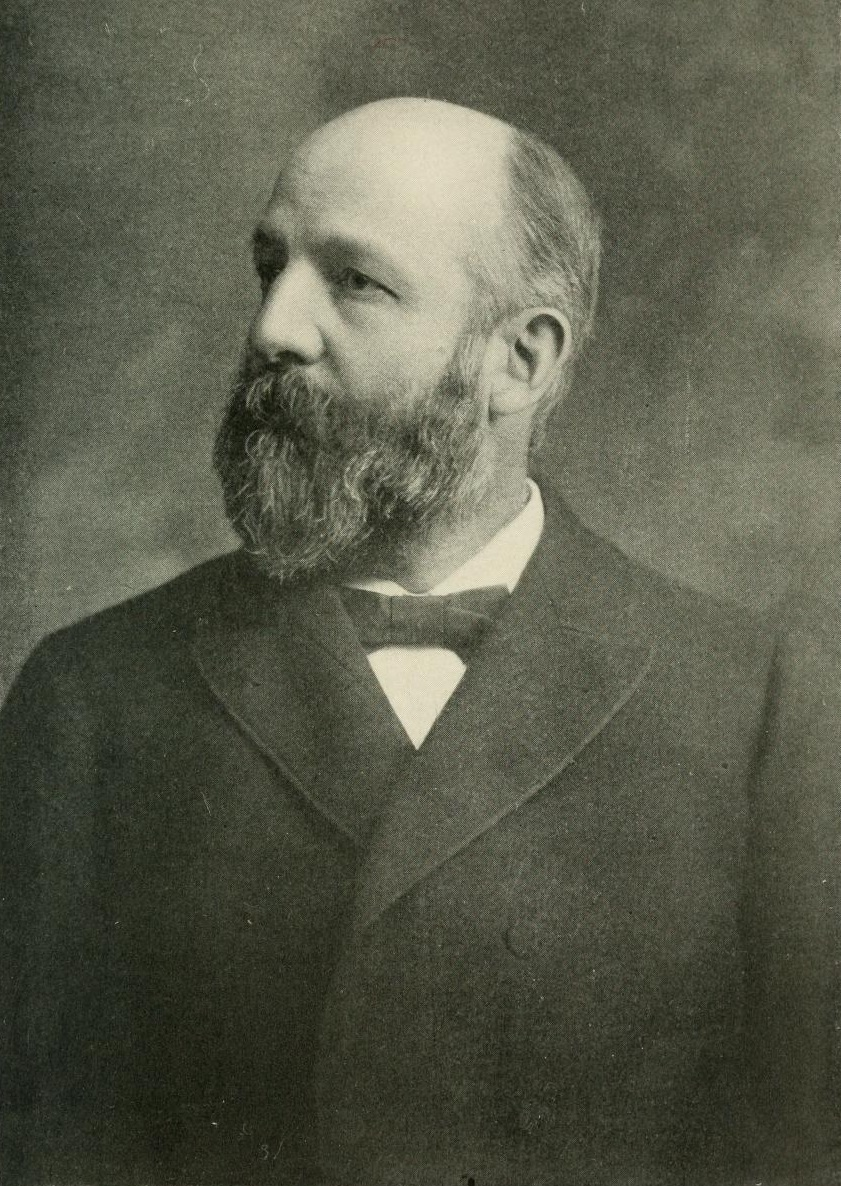
- From 1906's Albany Chronicles

Mayor of Albany, New York
- In office May 1, 1894 – December 31, 1895
- Preceded by: James Hilton Manning
- Succeeded by: John Boyd Thacher

Personal details
- Born: October 10, 1844; Boston, Massachusetts, U.S.
- Died: March 2, 1917 (aged 72); Manhattan, New York, U.S.
- Resting place: Albany Rural Cemetery, Menands, New York, U.S.
- Political party: Republican
- Spouse(s): Martha Emma Brooks (m. 1867); Josephine Judith Fourqurean (m. 1901)
- Children: 4
- Education: Columbia Law School (attended)
- Occupation: Merchant; Insurance executive

Oren Elbridge Wilson (October 10, 1844 – March 2, 1917) was an American businessman and politician from Albany, New York. A Republican, he served in local offices in Albany before becoming mayor.

A native of Boston, Wilson was raised and educated in Portsmouth, New Hampshire and attended Clinton Liberal Institute in the village of Clinton, New York. He attended Columbia Law School, but left before graduating to become an accountant with a New York City dry goods company. When the company relocated to Albany, Wilson settled there, and he rose to become the company's manager.

Wilson was active in local politics as a Republican, and served in offices including member of the school board and school board chairman. He was also a civic activist, including service as a manager and trustee of the Albany YMCA. In 1894, he was the successful Republican candidate for mayor and he served from May 1894 to December 1895.

After leaving office, Wilson pursued a career as manager of the Fidelity and Casualty Company of Chicago. He died at the Manhattan home of his daughter on March 2, 1917. Wilson was interred at Albany Rural Cemetery.

== Early life ==
Oren E. Wilson was born in Boston, Massachusetts on October 10, 1844, the son of Thomas Wilson, a building contractor, and Louisa (Manson) Wilson. He was raised in Portsmouth, New Hampshire, where he attended the local schools. He then attended the Clinton Liberal Institute in Clinton, New York. Following completion of his preparatory school course, Wilson attended Columbia Law School as a member of the class of 1865, but left without graduating so he could pursue a business career.

== Career ==
After leaving law school, Wilson joined the New York City dry goods firm of Whitney & Myers as the confidential secretary of senior partner William M. Whitney. When the partnership dissolved in 1870, Whitney and Wilson relocated to Albany, New York, where Wilson continued to work for Whitney's Dry Goods Company. Wilson was employed at Whitney's for nearly 30 years, and became the company's manager.

Wilson was active in politics as a Republican and served in local offices including member of the school board beginning in 1884 and chairman of the school board beginning in 1886. He was also a civic activist, and was both manager and a trustee of the Albany-area YMCA. In 1894, he was the successful nominee for Albany mayor. Though he was a Republican, Wilson was opposed to the party organization led by William Barnes Jr., and he was elected as a fusion candidate supported by anti-Barnes Republicans and Democrats interested in government reform and clean elections. He served from May 1894 to December 1895, and his administration was notable for improvements to the city's water filtration plant and pumping system, as well as an expansion of the city's paid fire department. Also during his tenure, the mayoral term was changed to begin on January 1 instead of May, and elections were moved from April to November. Wilson's time in office was extended to December 31, 1895, so the change could take effect in 1896. Wilson was a candidate for reelection in 1895, but lost to Democrat John Boyd Thacher in a three-way race.

Wilson maintained his involvement in politics after leaving office. In 1896, he supported William McKinley for president and was a member of New York's McKinley League. In 1898, he was an unsuccessful candidate for Secretary of State of New York running as the candidate of the independent Citizens' Union supporting government reforms including civil service.

== Later life ==
After serving as mayor, Wilson's business ventures included becoming an original incorporator of the company formed to bring electric lighting to Yonkers, New York. In 1911, he moved to Chicago, where he worked for several years as manager of the Fidelity and Casualty Company.

Wilson died at the Manhattan home of his daughter May on March 2, 1917. His funeral took place in Manhattan, and he was buried at Albany Rural Cemetery.

== Family ==
In 1867, Wilson married Martha Emma Brooks, with whom he had four children, one of whom lived to adulthood. She died in 1893, and in 1901, Wilson married Josephine Judith Fourqurean.

== Electoral history ==
1894 election for Mayor of Albany, New York

- Oren Elbridge Wilson (Republican) (Fusion), 13,145
- James Rooney (Democrat), 9,636
- Blank, 10

1895 election for Mayor of Albany, New York

- John Boyd Thacher (Democrat), 11,104
- William J. Walker (Republican), 6,767
- Oren Elbridge Wilson (Fusion), 3,253
