= Mary Fryer Manning =

American social leader (1844–1928)

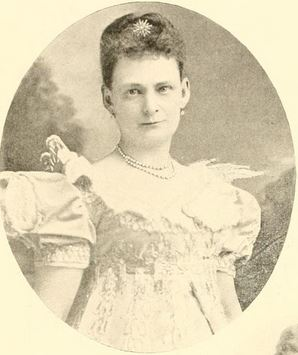
- Portrait from The Washington Sketchbook, 1895

U.S. Commissioner to the Exposition Universelle
- In office 14 April 1900 – 12 November 1900
- President: William McKinley

President-General of the National Society Daughters of the American Revolution
- In office 1898–1901
- Preceded by: Letitia Green Stevenson
- Succeeded by: Cornelia Cole Fairbanks

Personal details
- Born: Mary Margaretta Fryer; 1844 Albany, New York, U.S.
- Died: July 1928 (aged 83–84) Albany, New York, U.S.
- Resting place: Albany Rural Cemetery
- Party: Democratic
- Spouse: Daniel Manning
- Education: Albany Academy for Girls
- Occupation: Social leader

Mary Margaretta Fryer Manning (1844–1928) was an American social leader with wide experience in business, social, and philanthropic areas. During the years that her husband, Daniel Manning, held the portfolio of the United States Secretary of the Treasury, their home in Washington, D.C. became a center of social and political affairs in Washington. After widowhood in 1887, she spent part of each year in the city. Her patriotism was shown in her work for the Daughters of the American Revolution (DAR) Mohawk Chapter of Albany, New York, of which she was regent. Sent by President William McKinley to Paris in 1900, he appointed her commissioner to the Exposition Universelle and to represent the U.S. and the DAR at the unveiling of the statue of Gilbert du Motier, Marquis de Lafayette (July 4, 1900). The previous day, she assisted in unveiling the statue of George Washington, a gift of the women of the U.S. to France. Among her many roles, Manning served as President-General of the DAR for two terms.

== Early life and education ==
Mary Margaretta Fryer was born in Albany, New York. Her parents were William John Fryer, one of the early merchant princes of Albany, and Margaret Livingston (Crofts) Fryer. Mary Margaretta could trace her Dutch ancestry back many generations in Holland on her father's side. On her mother's side, she traced her ancestry from Robert Livingston, the first lord of Livingston Manor.

She was educated at the Albany Academy for Girls and private schools.

== Career ==
On November 19, 1884, in Albany, she married Daniel Manning, who, in the following March, was appointed U.S. Secretary of the Treasury under President Grover Cleveland.

At Washington, D.C., Mrs. Manning held a powerful position in social affairs, and though she returned to Albany after her husband's death in December 1887, kept up her Washington connections. She organized a hospital corps of a thousand women for service during the Spanish–American War (1898).

Besides serving as President-General of the DAR for two successive terms, she was regent of the Mohawk Chapter of the DAR, and in February 1900, was a member of its Memorial Continental Hall committee. For many years, she was vice-president of the Association of Women of America for the presentation of the statue of Washington to France. Manning was a delegate to represent the society in 1900, and with Mrs. John P. Jones, of Nevada, unveiled the statue before an assembly at Place des États-Unis, Paris, on July 3.

She was a U.S. commissioner to the Exposition Universelle (Paris, 1900). That year, French President Émile Loubet decorated her with the cross of the Legion of Honour.

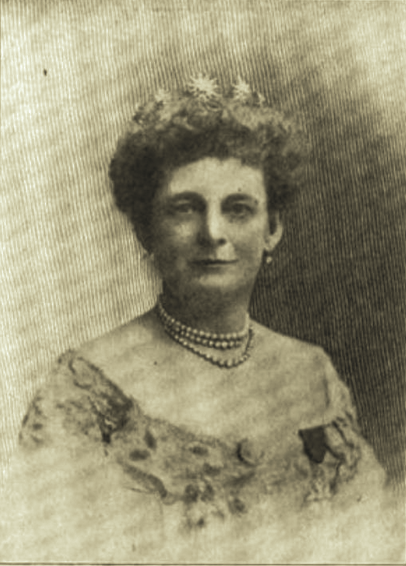
(1904)

In 1903, she was elected by the national commissioners a member-at-large of the Board of Lady Managers connected with the Louisiana Purchase Exposition (St. Louis, Missouri, 1904), and in December, she was elected president of the board to succeed Mrs. Blair, who had resigned.

Manning was an active member of the DAR, Colonial Dames of America, Society of Daughters of Holland Dames, and a Hereditary Life Member of the National Mary Washington Memorial Association. She was also a member of the Historical Art Association and the Country Club (Albany); Washington Club (Washington, D.C.); and Woman's Club (New York City).

== Death ==
Mary Margaretta Fryer Manning died at her home in Albany, New York in July 1928. She was buried next to her husband in Albany Rural Cemetery.

== Awards and honors ==
- Cross of Légion d'honneur (France)
- Created Chevalier, Légion d'honneur, January 30, 1901, considering services rendered at Paris Exposition, 1900.
- Officier de l'Instruction Publique (France)
- Chevalier de l'order de Leopold (Belgium)
