= Ebby Thacher =

American alcoholic

- Born: Edwin Throckmorton Thacher; April 29, 1896; Albany, New York, US
- Died: March 21, 1966 (aged 69); Ballston Spa, New York, US
- Resting place: Albany Rural Cemetery
- Other name: Ebby T.
- Education: The Albany Academy
- Known for: recognized as Alcoholics Anonymous co-founder Bill Wilson's sponsor
- Parent(s): George Hornell Thacher II, Emma Louise Bennett
- Family: John Boyd Thacher II (brother); John Boyd Thacher (uncle); George Hornell Thacher (grandfather)

Edwin Throckmorton "Ebby" Thacher (29 April 1896 – 21 March 1966) (commonly known as Ebby T.) was a longtime friend and later the sponsor of Alcoholics Anonymous co-founder Bill Wilson. He is credited with introducing Wilson to the initial principles that AA would soon develop, such as "one alcoholic talking to another," and the Jungian thesis which was passed along to Rowland Hazard and, in turn, to Thacher that alcoholics could recover by a "genuine conversion".

== Early life, family and education ==
Edwin Throckmorton Thacher was born April 29, 1896, in Albany, New York, the last of seven children born to Emma Louise (Bennett) and George Hornell Thacher II. His grandfather George Hornell Thacher was founder/owner of Thacher Car Works, vice-president of the Albany City National Bank, and Albany mayor 1860–62 and 1870–74. Edwin's uncle John Boyd Thacher was a member of the New York State Senate and was also mayor of Albany (1886–88 and 1896–97), as did Edwin's brother John Boyd Thacher II (1927–40).

The family fortune derived from Thacher Car Works, the company founded in 1852 by Edwin's grandfather and later owned by John Boyd Thacher. Thacher Car Works manufactured wheels and the underpinnings for railroad cars — the wheels supplied mainly to the New York Central Railroad. In 1914, Edwin's aunt, Emma Treadwell Thacher, donated 350 acres (140 ha) to what became John Boyd Thacher State Park in Voorheesville, New York.

Like his brothers, Edwin attended The Albany Academy. Due to disappointing academic performance, however, his parents placed him in residence at Burr and Burton Seminary in 1912 in nearby Manchester, Vermont. This had been Bill Wilson’s school since 1909, and the two became friends.

== Alcoholism and involvement in formation of Alcoholics Anonymous ==
Thacher was a school friend of Wilson, and battled his whole life with alcoholism, frequently landing in mental hospitals or jail. After one bender, three members of The Oxford Group (Rowland Hazard, F. Shepard Cornell, and Cebra Graves) convinced the court to parole Thacher into their custody. Hazard taught Thacher the Oxford Group principles and the idea that a conversion was needed between patients. Hazard lodged him in the Calvary Rescue Mission, operated by the Calvary Episcopal Church in New York City.

In November 1934, Thacher had arranged a visit to Wilson's apartment. Expecting to spend a day drinking and re-living old times, Wilson was instead shocked by Thacher's refusal to drink. "I've found religion," he reportedly said, to Wilson's surprise. Thacher told Wilson of his conversion at the Rescue Mission and acquainted Wilson with the teachings of Rowland Hazard about the Oxford Group life-changing program, as well as the prescription of Carl Jung for a conversion.

Wilson at first declined Thacher's invitation to sobriety, and continued to drink in a more restrained way for a short while. After talking with William D. Silkworth, however, he went to Calvary Rescue Mission and underwent a religious conversion after once again being admitted to the Charles B. Towns Hospital for Drug and Alcohol Addiction in New York City on December 11, 1934. Thacher visited him there on December 14 and essentially helped Wilson take what would become Steps Three, Four, Five, Six, Seven, and Eight.

Wilson stayed sober and eventually formed Alcoholics Anonymous with Bob Smith. Thacher was the assistant director of High Watch Recovery Center in Kent, Connecticut in the summers of 1946 and 1947, during which time he remained sober. He returned to drinking after his tenure as Director.

Wilson always called Thacher his "sponsor," and even though he had returned to drinking, Wilson looked after his friend's welfare for the rest of his life. Thacher struggled on and off with sobriety over the years, and ultimately died sober in Ballston Spa, New York from emphysema in 1966. He is buried in his family plot at Albany Rural Cemetery in Albany, New York.

== Cinematic portrayals ==
Thacher was portrayed by Gary Sinise in the TV movie My Name Is Bill W. (1989), which dramatized the founding of AA. Thacher was portrayed by Adam Reid in the TV movie When Love Is Not Enough: The Lois Wilson Story (2010), which dramatized the founding of Al-Anon.

== See also ==
- Twelve-step program
- Twelve traditions
- Substance dependence
