= Lester B. Faulkner =

American lawyer

Lester Bradner Faulkner (April 4, 1837 – January 27, 1890) was an American farmer, lawyer, and politician from New York. He served as Chairman of the New York State Democratic Committee from 1878 to 1881.

== Life ==
Faulkner was born on April 4, 1837, in Dansville, New York, the son of James Faulkner and Minerva Hammond.

Faulkner attended Yale College with two of his brothers, graduating with them in 1859. While at Yale, he was a member of Brothers in Unity, Kappa Sigma Epsilon, Delta Kappa Epsilon, and Phi Beta Kappa. After graduating, he returned to Dansville and worked as a farmer.

In the autumn of 1862, during the American Civil War, Faulkner raised a company of volunteers. He joined the company as a private, but was quickly promoted to captain and then lieutenant colonel of the 136th New York Infantry Regiment. When he was discharged in January 1865, he had the brevet rank of brigadier-general for gallantry. For a long time, he commanded his regiment, and at one point also commanded the brigade it was attached to. He participated in a number of important battles during the War, including Fredericksburg, Gettysburg, Chattanooga, and Resaca. He was with General Sherman during the March to the Sea.

After he was mustered out, Faulkner began studying law and opened a law office with Charles J. Bissell. However, he largely worked managing his father's farming interests. He became active in politics, and was considered Samuel J. Tilden's most trusted lieutenant in Western New York from 1874 until Tilden's retirement from active leadership in the state Democratic Party. Daniel Manning also favored Faulkner, and under both leaders he fought against Tammany Hall in the Democratic State Conventions. In

In 1879, Faulkner became Chairman of the New York State Democratic Committee. He was a delegate to the 1868, 1880, and 1884 Democratic National Conventions. In the 1884 Convention, he opposed Grover Cleveland's nomination and supported Roswell P. Flower instead. Cleveland's subsequent nomination and election to the Presidency marked the end of his influence in state and local politics, and after Cleveland's inauguration he focused exclusively on his business interests.

Faulkner was a director of the Dansville Bank, which his father founded and his brother James served as president of. The bank closed in 1887, which revealed corruption in the bank's management. James fled to Canada, only to return to testify against his brother. Faulkner was then arrested for having guilty knowledge of the bank's management and knowingly signing a false statement to the Comptroller of the Currency. He was tried in May 1889 before the United States District Court for embezzling $150,000, but the jury stood 11 to 1 in favor of conviction. He was also tried in October 1889 and found guilty, sentenced to seven years in the Erie County Penitentiary. An appeal was taken and a stay was granted.

In 1859, Faulkner married Lizzie W. Goundry. They had one daughter, Elizabeth Harrison, who died in infancy.

Faulkner died from pneumonia in his farm house in Canaseraga on January 27, 1890. He was buried in Green Mount Cemetery in Dansville.

Party political offices
Preceded by William Purcell	New York State Democratic Committee Chairman; 1878 – 1881	Succeeded by Daniel Manning
