= Harmon S. Cutting =

American politician

37th Mayor of Buffalo
- In office December 29, 1882 – January 16, 1883
- Preceded by: Marcus M. Drake
- Succeeded by: John B. Manning

Personal details
- Born: September 9, 1820 Bradfield, Essex, England
- Died: April 25, 1884 (aged 63) Buffalo, New York
- Resting place: Forest Lawn Cemetery, Buffalo, New York
- Party: Democratic

Harmon Sydney Cutting (September 9, 1820 – April 25, 1884) was mayor of the city of Buffalo, New York, serving from December 1882 to January 1883, in the aftermath after the resignation of Grover Cleveland.

He was born in England in 1820 and emigrated to the United States in 1836. He began studying law in 1845, was admitted to the bar, and opened a practice in Buffalo in 1853.

A Democrat, in 1862 and 1863, Cutting served as city attorney under Mayor William Fargo. He was a member of the New York State Assembly (Erie Co., 2nd D.) in 1865.

In 1882, he was appointed the mayor's clerk by Mayor Grover Cleveland. On December 29, 1882, Cutting was appointed mayor pro tem, after interim Mayor Marcus M. Drake resigned, until the special election on January 9, 1883. Cutting gave up his short term as mayor when John B. Manning was sworn in on January 16, 1883, and served as city clerk until his death in 1884. He died of pneumonia on April 25, 1884, and his funeral was attended by Cleveland, who was then governor of New York. Cutting was buried in Forest Lawn Cemetery.

New York State Assembly
Preceded by Frederick P. Stevens	New York State Assembly; Erie County, 2nd District; 1865	Succeeded by John J. L. C. Jewett
Political offices
Preceded by Marcus M. Drake	Mayor of Buffalo, New York; 1882–1883	Succeeded by John B. Manning
