= John B. Manning =

American politician

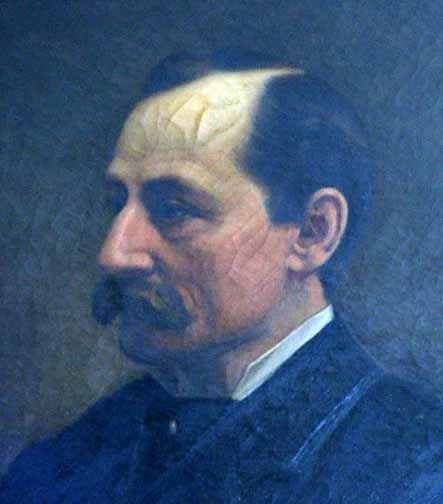
- Portrait of John B. Manning

38th Mayor of Buffalo
- In office January 16, 1883 – January 6, 1884
- Preceded by: Harmon S. Cutting
- Succeeded by: Jonathan Scoville

Personal details
- Born: John Baker Manning; July 13, 1833 Albany, New York
- Died: April 28, 1908 (aged 74) Brooklyn, New York
- Party: Democratic
- Spouses: Elizabeth House (m. 1856; died 1894) Marie Schwank (m. 1897; died 1908)
- Relations: Daniel Manning (brother); James Hilton Manning (nephew)
- Children: 7

John Baker Manning (July 13, 1833 – April 28, 1908) was Mayor of the City of Buffalo, New York, serving during January 1883 – 1884, in the aftermath of the resignation of Grover Cleveland.

== Early life ==
Manning was born July 13, 1833, in Albany, New York. He was a son of John Manning and Eleanor (née Oley) Manning. Among his siblings was Daniel Manning, who served as United States Secretary of the Treasury from 1885 to 1887. James Hilton Manning, who served as mayor of Albany, was his nephew.

As a child, Manning served as a page in the New York State Assembly and New York State Senate.

== Career ==
In 1860–1862, he was the Albany correspondent for the Brooklyn Eagle. Several years later, he moved to Buffalo and established his commission and malting businesses there.

Manning was elected mayor in a special election held on January 9, 1883, as the Democratic candidate. He continued the string of vetoes begun by Mayor Grover Cleveland; they saved the city a great financial loss. Manning retired from politics after losing his campaign for re-election.

He continued to grow and expand the malting business and built several grain elevators in the 1890s, each with a large storage capacity. On May 30, 1902, the largest fire Black Rock had ever seen consumed Manning's Frontier Canada plant.

== Personal life ==
On January 14, 1856, Manning was married to Elizabeth House of Troy, New York. Before her death in 1894, they were the parents of:

- Franklin Manning (1856–1935), who married Jennie Louise Ogden in 1881. After her death in 1885, he married Anna Marguerite Sapp.
- Lillian Manning (1859–1929), who married Henry W. Root.
- John O. Manning (1863–1928), who married Julia Millington in 1884.
- Mary Elizabeth Manning (1865–1926), who married Richard Coulter Osterhout.
- William H. Manning (1868–1943), who married Harriet E.
- Daniel V. Manning (1872–1931), who married Florence P. Freeman in 1900.
- Grace Manning (1878–1879), who died young.

After her death, he married Marie Ellenora "Mary" Schwank of Reading, Pennsylvania in 1897. Mary, the daughter of Adam Schwank and Marianna Elizabeth (née Hartman) Schwank, was the half-sister of actor Bernard "Barney" (Schwank) McDonough.

He died on April 28, 1908, at 953 St. Mark's Avenue, his home in Brooklyn, New York, and is buried in Forest Lawn Cemetery.

Political offices
| Preceded by Harmon S. Cutting | Mayor of Buffalo, NY; 1883–1884 | Succeeded by Jonathan Scoville |
