= Jonathan Scoville =

American politician

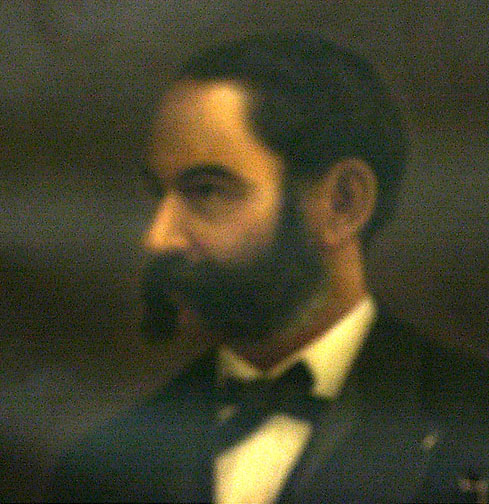
- Portrait of Jonathan Scoville

39th Mayor of Buffalo
- In office 1884–1885
- Preceded by: John B. Manning
- Succeeded by: Philip Becker

Member of the U.S. House of Representatives from New York's 32nd district
- In office November 12, 1880 – March 3, 1883
- Preceded by: Nathan K. Hall
- Succeeded by: Solomon G. Haven

Personal details
- Born: July 14, 1830 Salisbury, Connecticut, USA
- Died: March 4, 1891 (aged 60) Salisbury, Connecticut, USA
- Party: Democratic
- Spouse: never married

Jonathan Scoville (July 14, 1830 – March 4, 1891) was an American businessman who served two terms as a U.S. representative from New York from 1880 to 1883, and as mayor of Buffalo from 1884 to 1885.

== Biography ==
Born in Salisbury, Connecticut, Scoville attended various educational institutions in Massachusetts, including the scientific department of Harvard University.

He engaged in business in Canaan, Connecticut, in 1854 as an iron manufacturer and mine owner. He moved to Buffalo, New York, in 1860 and established a car-wheel foundry, and the next year established another in Toronto, Ontario, Canada.

=== Political career ===
==== Congress ====
Scoville was elected as a Democrat to the Forty-sixth Congress to fill the vacancy caused by the resignation of Ray V. Pierce. He was reelected to the Forty-seventh Congress and served from November 12, 1880, to March 3, 1883. He was not a candidate for renomination in 1882.

=== Mayor of Buffalo ===
He served as mayor of Buffalo in 1884 and 1885.

=== Death ===
He died in New York City, March 4, 1891. He was interred in Salisbury Cemetery, Salisbury, Connecticut.

== Sources ==
- "Jonathon Scoville". Through The Mayor's Eyes, The Only Complete History of the Mayor's of Buffalo, New York, Compiled by Michael Rizzo. The Buffalonian is produced by The Peoples History Union. 2009-05-27.
- United States Congress. "Jonathan Scoville (id: S000190)". Biographical Directory of the United States Congress.

Political offices
Preceded by John B. Manning	Mayor of Buffalo, NY; 1884–1885	Succeeded by Philip Becker
U.S. House of Representatives
Preceded by Ray V. Pierce	Member of the U.S. House of Representatives from New York's 32nd congressional district 1880-11-12 – 1883	Succeeded by William Findlay Rogers
