= Marcus M. Drake =

American politician (1835–1907)

Captain Marcus M. Drake
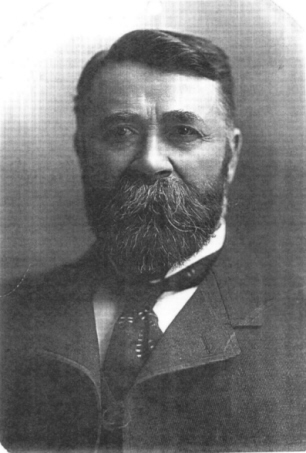

36th Mayor of Buffalo
- In office November 20, 1882 – December 29, 1882
- Preceded by: S. Grover Cleveland
- Succeeded by: Harmon S. Cutting

Personal details
- Born: September 7, 1835 DeRuyter, New York
- Died: September 28, 1907 (aged 72) Buffalo, New York
- Party: Republican
- Spouses: Persis L. Bennett; Mary A. Ludlow; Lillian Quest
- Children: 6

Marcus Motier Drake (September 7, 1835 – September 28, 1907) was the mayor of the city of Buffalo, New York, serving from November to December 1882, after the resignation of Grover Cleveland.

== Biography ==
Drake was born in DeRuyter, New York on September 7, 1835. When two years old, his family moved near Fredonia, New York. He graduated from Fredonia Academy in 1852. In 1861, Drake was made a captain and given command of the "Genesee Chief" steamer. In August 1862, he enlisted in the Union Army at Dunkirk, New York, and entered as a private in the 72d Regiment, N.Y. Volunteers. In the spring of 1865, Drake's term ended and he was transferred to 120th Regiment, NY Volunteers. Upon his transfer, he was promoted to the rank of 1st Lieutenant and placed in command of Company H, which was present at the surrender at Appomattox. In 1872, he was appointed Superintendent of the Union Dry Dock Company, upon its organization.

In 1860, Drake married Persis L. Bennett of Hamlet, New York, who died soon after their marriage. In 1867, he remarried with Mary A. Ludlow; she died in 1880 and he married Lillian Quest in 1900.

In the fall of 1878, Drake was elected Alderman for the Eleventh Ward. Upon the resignation of Grover Cleveland as mayor on November 20, 1882, to take the Governor's seat, the Common Council elected Drake to fill the vacancy until a special election could be held in early January 1883. He resigned on December 22, 1882, to take effect on December 29, 1882, in order to return to his newly elected duties as alderman. He retired from the Board of Aldermen in 1890. In 1895, under Mayor Edgar B. Jewett, Drake was made Commissioner of Public Works, a position he held from January 1896 until December 1900. During his commissionership, a giant boulder was placed in the meadow of Delaware Park, marking the burial site of 300 unknown soldiers of the War of 1812.

Drake died on September 28, 1907, and was buried in Forest Lawn Cemetery.

Political offices
Preceded by Grover Cleveland	Mayor of Buffalo, NY; 1882	Succeeded by Harmon S. Cutting
