= Edward A. Maher =

American businessman and politician (1848–1920)

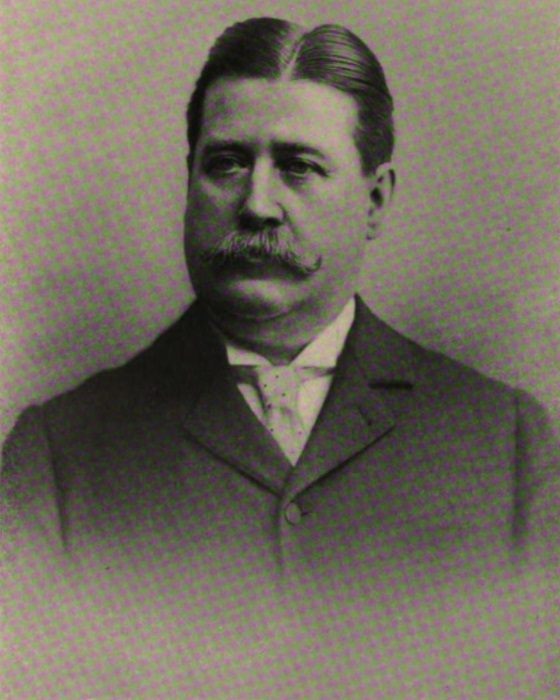
- From 1906's Albany Chronicles: A History of the City Arranged Chronologically

Mayor of Albany, New York
- In office May 1, 1888 – May 4, 1890
- Preceded by: John Boyd Thacher
- Succeeded by: James Hilton Manning

Member of the New York State Assembly from the Albany County 3rd District
- In office January 1, 1883 – December 31, 1884
- Preceded by: Amasa J. Parker Jr.
- Succeeded by: Patrick Murray

President of the Albany County, New York Board of Supervisors
- In office 1879–1883
- Preceded by: Jesse C. Dayton
- Succeeded by: Ansel C. Requa

Member of the Albany County, New York Board of Supervisors from the 4th Ward of Albany
- In office 1876–1883
- Preceded by: James Macfarlane
- Succeeded by: Patrick Cuddy

Personal details
- Born: May 20, 1848 Albany, New York
- Died: September 13, 1920 (aged 72) Manhattan, New York
- Resting place: Saint Raymond's Cemetery, Bronx, New York
- Party: Democratic
- Spouse: Jane "Jennie" S. Tiernan (m. 1869–1910, her death)
- Children: 8
- Parent(s): Thomas Maher; Julia (Pendergast) Maher
- Education: Albany Normal School
- Occupation: Businessman

Edward A. Maher (May 20, 1848 – September 13, 1920) was a business executive and political figure from Albany, New York. A Democrat, he was most notable for his two terms in the New York State Assembly from 1883 to 1884 and his term as mayor of Albany from 1888 to 1890.

== Early life ==
Edward Augustin Maher was born in Albany, New York, on May 20, 1848, the son of Thomas Maher and Julia (Pendergast) Maher. He was educated at Albany's Christian Brothers Academy and was an 1867 graduate of the Albany Normal School (now the State University of New York at Albany). Maher pursued a business and banking career, and became manager of the Albany Electric Illuminating Company and president of Albany's South End Bank.

== Political career ==
Maher was active in politics and government as a Democrat and served in a variety of elected and appointed positions. From 1876 to 1883 he represented Albany's Fourth Ward on the Albany County Board of Supervisors, and in 1879 he was chosen to serve as the board's president. From 1878 to 1880, he was a clerk of the New York Supreme Court, and from 1878 to 1881 he was deputy county clerk of Albany County.

In 1882, he was elected to the New York State Assembly, and he was reelected in 1883. From 1888 to 1890, Maher served as mayor of Albany.

== Later life ==
In 1892, Maher moved to New York City, where he served as president of the Union Railway, a venture that combined several streetcar franchises into one company. When the Union Railway became part of the Third Avenue Railway in 1896, Maher was appointed to serve as Third Avenue's vice president. In 1917, Maher succeeded to the presidency of the Third Avenue line, and he retired in 1918.

== Death and burial ==
Maher died at his Manhattan home on September 13, 1920. He was buried in the old section of Saint Raymond's Cemetery in the Bronx.

== Family ==
In 1869, Maher married Jane "Jennie" S. Tiernan of Albany. They were the parents of eight children: Thomas, Edward, Julia, Jane, Robert, Kathleen, Florence, and John.

New York State Assembly
Preceded by Amasa J. Parker, Jr.	New York State Assembly; Albany County, 3rd District; 1883–1884	Succeeded by Patrick Murray
Political offices
Preceded by John Boyd Thacher	Mayor of Albany, New York; 1888–1890	Succeeded by James Hilton Manning
