= Amasa J. Parker Jr. =

American politician

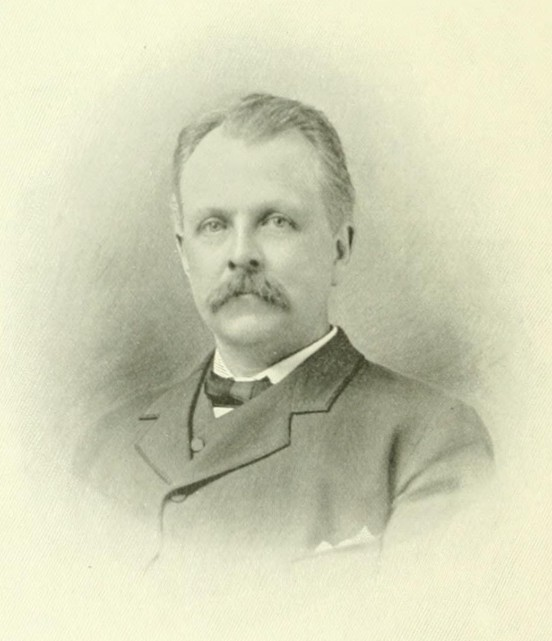
- Parker, 1897

Member of the New York State Assembly from the Albany district
- In office January 1, 1882 – December 31, 1882
- Preceded by: Aaron B. Pratt
- Succeeded by: Edward A. Maher

Member of the New York Senate from the 17th district
- In office January 1, 1886 – December 31, 1887
- Preceded by: John Boyd Thacher
- Succeeded by: Henry Russell
- In office January 1, 1892 – December 31, 1893
- Preceded by: Norton Chase
- Succeeded by: Jacob Rice

Member of the New York Senate from the 19th district
- In office January 1, 1894 – December 31, 1885
- Preceded by: Louis W. Emerson
- Succeeded by: John Ford

Personal details
- Born: May 6, 1843 Delhi, New York, USA
- Died: May 2, 1938 (aged 94) Albany, New York, USA
- Resting place: Albany Rural Cemetery
- Party: Democratic
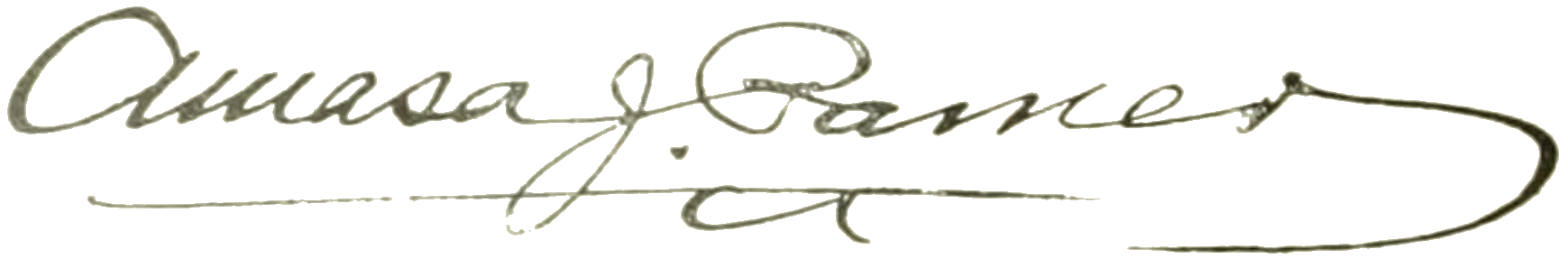
- Signature

Amasa Junius Parker (May 6, 1843 – May 2, 1938) was a member of the New York State Senate and a Major General of the National Guard of New York.

== Life ==
Parker was born on May 6, 1843, in Delhi, Delaware County, New York. He was the son of Amasa J. Parker and his wife Harriet Langdon Parker. He graduated from Union College, Schenectady, New York in 1863 and the Albany Law School in 1864. He fought in the American Civil War and became a major.

He was a member of the New York State Assembly (Albany Co., 3rd D.) in 1882; and of the New York State Senate (17th D.) in 1886 and 1887; and again of the State Senate from 1892 to 1895, sitting in the 115th, 116th (both 17th D.), 117th and 118th New York State Legislatures (both 19th D.).

He was a trustee of Union College and the Albany Law School. He was active in the National Guard of New York and was a colonel in command of the Tenth Division during the breakup of the Albany Railroad Strike of 1877.

Parker was one of the authors of the book Banking Law of New York. He was also an editor of the Parker's New York Criminal and Penal Codes as well as The Parker's Pocket Code of Civil Procedure.

Parker died on May 2, 1938, in Albany, New York. He was buried at the Albany Rural Cemetery in Menands, New York.

New York State Assembly
Preceded by Aaron B. Pratt	New York State Assembly; Albany County; 1882; With: Michael J. Gorman, Aaron Fuller, John McDonough	Succeeded by Edward A. Maher
New York State Senate
Preceded by John Boyd Thacher	New York State Senate; 17th District; 1886–1887	Succeeded by Henry Russell
Preceded by Norton Chase	New York State Senate; 17th District; 1892–1893	Succeeded by Jacob Rice
Preceded by Louis W. Emerson	New York State Senate; 19th District; 1894–1895	Succeeded by John Ford
