= Ray V. Pierce =

American politician (1840–1914)

Ray Vaughn Pierce
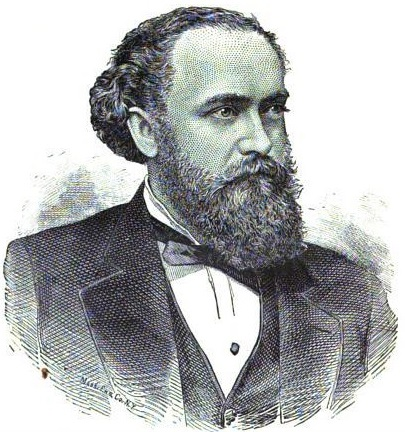
- Frontispiece of 1888's The People's Common Sense Medical Advisor

Member of the U.S. House of Representatives from New York's 32nd district
- In office 1879–1880
- Preceded by: Daniel N. Lockwood
- Succeeded by: Jonathan Scoville

Member of the New York State Senate from the 31st district
- In office 1878–1879
- Preceded by: E. Carleton Sprague
- Succeeded by: Benjamin H. Williams

Personal details
- Born: February 4, 1840 Stark, New York, U.S.
- Died: February 4, 1914 (aged 73) St. Vincent Island, Florida, U.S.
- Resting place: Forest Lawn Cemetery, Buffalo, New York, U.S.
- Party: Republican
- Occupation: Physician, entrepreneur, automobile manufacturer, environmentalist

Ray Vaughn Pierce (August 6, 1840 – February 4, 1914) was an American physician, patent medicine manufacturer and marketer, entrepreneur, automobile pioneer, New York state senator and a U.S. representative from New York.

An Eclectic Medical College of Cincinnati graduate, Pierce earned millions of dollars selling patent medicines, first primarily by mail and later over the counter. He claimed his "treatments" could cure many diseases and medical conditions, including consumption (tuberculosis), blood and liver problems as well as alleviate many "women’s complaints". Many referred to Pierce as "The Prince of Quacks".

== Early life ==
Born in Stark, New York, Pierce was the second of Duane and Mary (née Morse) Pierce's four children. He attended public and private schools, and taught school before deciding to become a doctor.

=== Military ===
Pierce registered for the draft in Pennsylvania during the Civil War. At the time he was 23 years old and unmarried. He listed his occupation as "Physician".

== Medical career ==
In 1862, he graduated from Eclectic Medical College in Cincinnati, Ohio. He practiced medicine in Titusville, Pennsylvania, from 1862 to 1866, and moved to Buffalo, New York, in 1867.

=== Patent medicines ===
Pierce engaged in the manufacture and sale of patent medicines and established the Invalids' Hotel and Surgical Institute. His manufacturing business started with "Doctor Pierce's Favorite Prescription", which he followed with other medicines, including Smart Weed and Dr. Pierce's Pleasant Pellets. His venture proved a success, with nearly one million bottles of Dr. Pierce's Smart Weed and other preparations shipped annually.

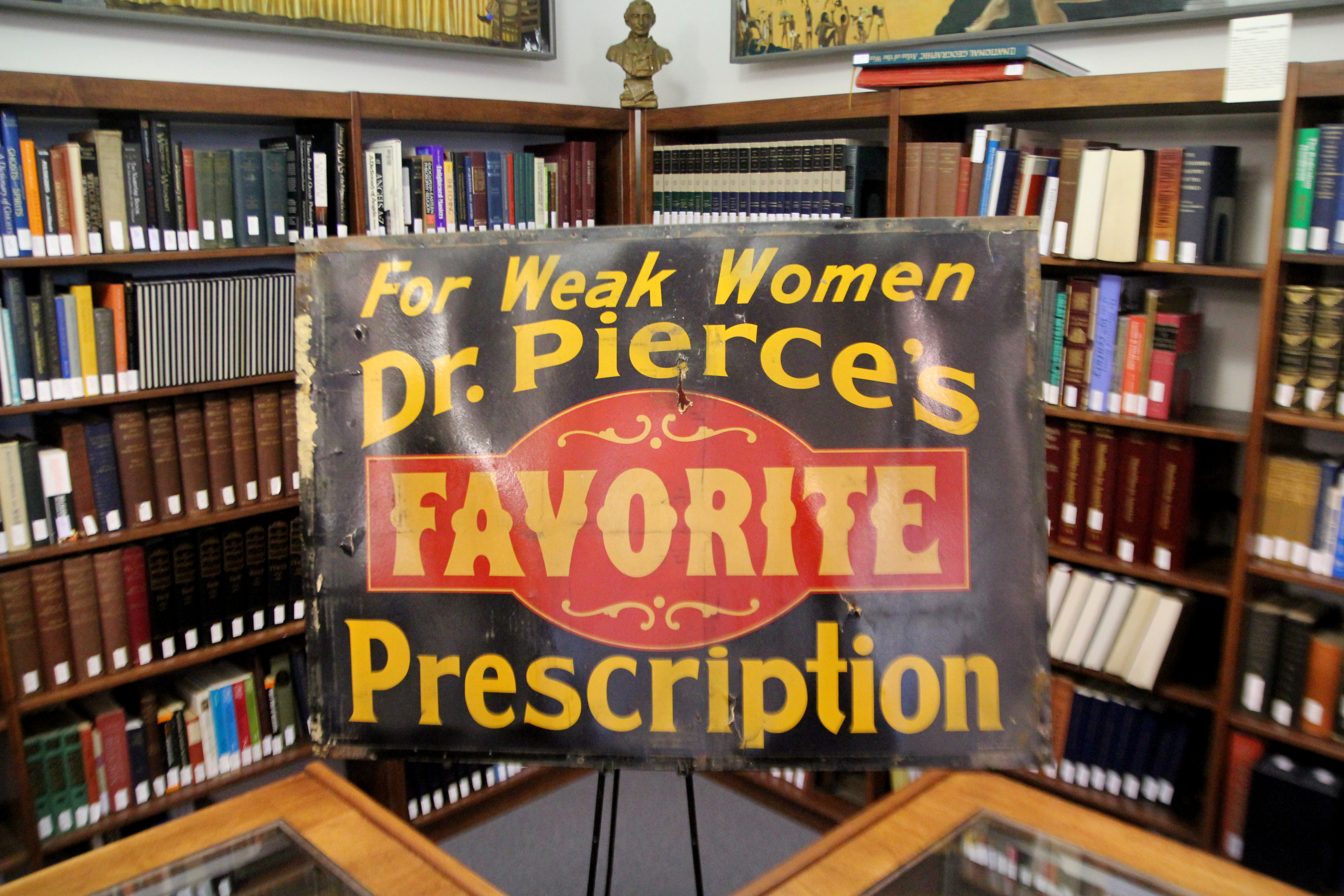
Dr Pierce's Favorite Prescription sign

== Entrepreneur ==
Pierce expanded his patent medicine business through creating and investing in a series of interlocking businesses from his ever-growing profit. He also invested in other business ventures.

=== Glass bottle production ===
Pierce charged his son Valentine Mott Pierce with creating a source for the millions of glass bottles used in selling the company's many patent medicines. First leasing the Eagle Glass Works at Brockwayville, Pennsylvania in 1904, in 1905 son Pierce purchased the St. Marys Glass Company at St. Marys, Pennsylvania. Pierce renamed the business the "Pierce Glass Company". The success of the business was so great the company also produced custom bottles for patent medicine competitors including Pond’s Extract, Lydia Pinkham and many others.

World Dispensary Medical Association embossed medicine bottles were produced for the company's London office at 3 New Oxford Street. Occasionally these are found in old refuse sites in Britain.

=== California gold mining ===
Pierce funded the Big Bend Tunnel and Mining Company, holding "sixty to seventy percent" of the operation's $20,000,000 (equivalent to $716,666,667 in 2025) capital stock. Thomas Edison had suggested the gravel bed of the North Fork Feather River in Butte County, California should be explored for gold deposits. The project required building a dam which formed a two mile lake behind it. The dam diverted the river's water into a large tunnel in order to expose rich gold deposits thought to be in the river's gravel bed. The exposed river bed measured almost a mile in length.

Pierce underwrote the Big Bend Tunnel project for $750,000 (equivalent to $26,875,000 in 2025). The project started in 1892 and the 12,000 foot tunnel was completed in 1887. The project also required the construction of an electric generation station which provided power for mining equipment and pumps. The construction site was the first to use night illumination which was provided by Edison.

Gold was not recovered in amounts to make the project profitable. Although the project was successfully completed, the reported net loss was $2,000,000 (equivalent to $71,666,667 in 2025). Pierce said "... after all our efforts and much as we regret to acknowledge the fact, yet we are quite prepared to admit that at present we see no prospect of realizing our former expectations with respect to these mines".

=== Automobile manufacturer ===
Pierce incorporated his automobile business in 1900 as the "Dr. Pierce Auto Manufacturing Company" in Newark, New Jersey. He began manufacturing, first producing the Pierce electric wagon in 1900, designed for delivering newspapers. That vehicle had a load capacity of 1,000 pounds, used two 10 horsepower electric motors governed to three forward speeds (3, 4 1/2 and 10 mph) and had a range of 25 miles. The car was built in Buffalo, New York. His automobiles had no connection with the Pierce-Arrow line of autos also built in Buffalo by George Norman Pierce.

In 1901 Pierce moved production to Bound Brook, New Jersey. He was able to source the electric motors for his vehicles from his nearby American Engine Company. He expanded the range of electric vehicles to include light delivery trucks and a number of open-top "phaeton" auto models.

Pierce said of his automobiles "Our vehicles are built as attractively as is possible without a sacrifice of strength to beauty, which would be dangerous to the stability of the vehicle or perilous to the life of its occupants... Our automobiles have not any of the sulky or spider effect, but are good, staunch-looking vehicles, ready for any test or ordeal". A 1904 Pierce phaeton cost $1,600 (equivalent to $57,333 in 2025).

Pierce reorganized, renaming the automobile company the "Pierce Electric Company". The company was dissolved in 1904.

== Saint Vincent Island game preserve ==
Pierce purchased St. Vincent Island, Apalachicola, Florida in 1907, to ensure it would remain an unsullied game preserve. It was often visited by him, his family and guests. Pierce imported four East Indian Sambar deer (three does and a buck) from the Bronx Zoo to the island in 1908. After his death in 1914, the island remained in the Pierce family until 1948.

== Death and burial ==
Pierce died on February 4, 1914, at his winter home on St. Vincent Island, Florida.

His body was taken to Buffalo, New York and cremated there. His funeral rites were held in his home Monday, February 9th. His ashes were interred at Forest Lawn Cemetery, Section One, Lot 127 in Buffalo.

== Family ==
Pierce was married to Mary Jane Smith. They were the parents of five children, three of whom reached adulthood: Valentine Mott, known as V. Mott; Hugh C.; and Ralph Waldo, known as Waldo.

== Publications ==
- Chronic Diseases of the Generative and Urinary Organs. World's Dispensary Medical Association. 1871.
- Chronic Diseases of the Generative and Urinary Organs of Males. World's Dispensary Medical Association. 1874.
- Chronic Diseases Peculiar to Women. World's Dispensary Medical Association. 1883.
- The People's Common Sense Medical Adviser. World's Dispensary Medical Association. 1883.
- Epilepsy (Fits) and St. Vitus's Dance (Chorea) - World Dispensary Dime Series. Invalids' Hotel and Surgical Institute. 1885.
- A Treatise on Chronic Diseases With Suggestions as to Their Successful Treatment. Dr. Pierce, Buffalo, N.Y. 1880s.
- Pierce's Memorandum and Account Book designed for Farmers, Mechanics And All People. World's Dispensary Medical Association. 1902.
- Ladies' Note Book and Calendar. World's Dispensary Medical Association. 1913.
- Chronic diseases of the generative and urinary organs. Buffalo, N.Y.: N.p., 1871.
- Chronic diseases of the generative and urinary organs of males. Buffalo, N.Y.: N.p., 1874.
- Chronic diseases peculiar to women. Buffalo, N.Y.: N.p., 1874.

New York State Senate
Preceded by E. Carleton Sprague	New York State Senate; 31st District; 1878–1879	Succeeded by Benjamin H. Williams
U.S. House of Representatives
Preceded by Daniel N. Lockwood	Member of the U.S. House of Representatives from New York's 32nd congressional district 1879–1880	Succeeded by Jonathan Scoville
