= Hamilton Leroy Shields =

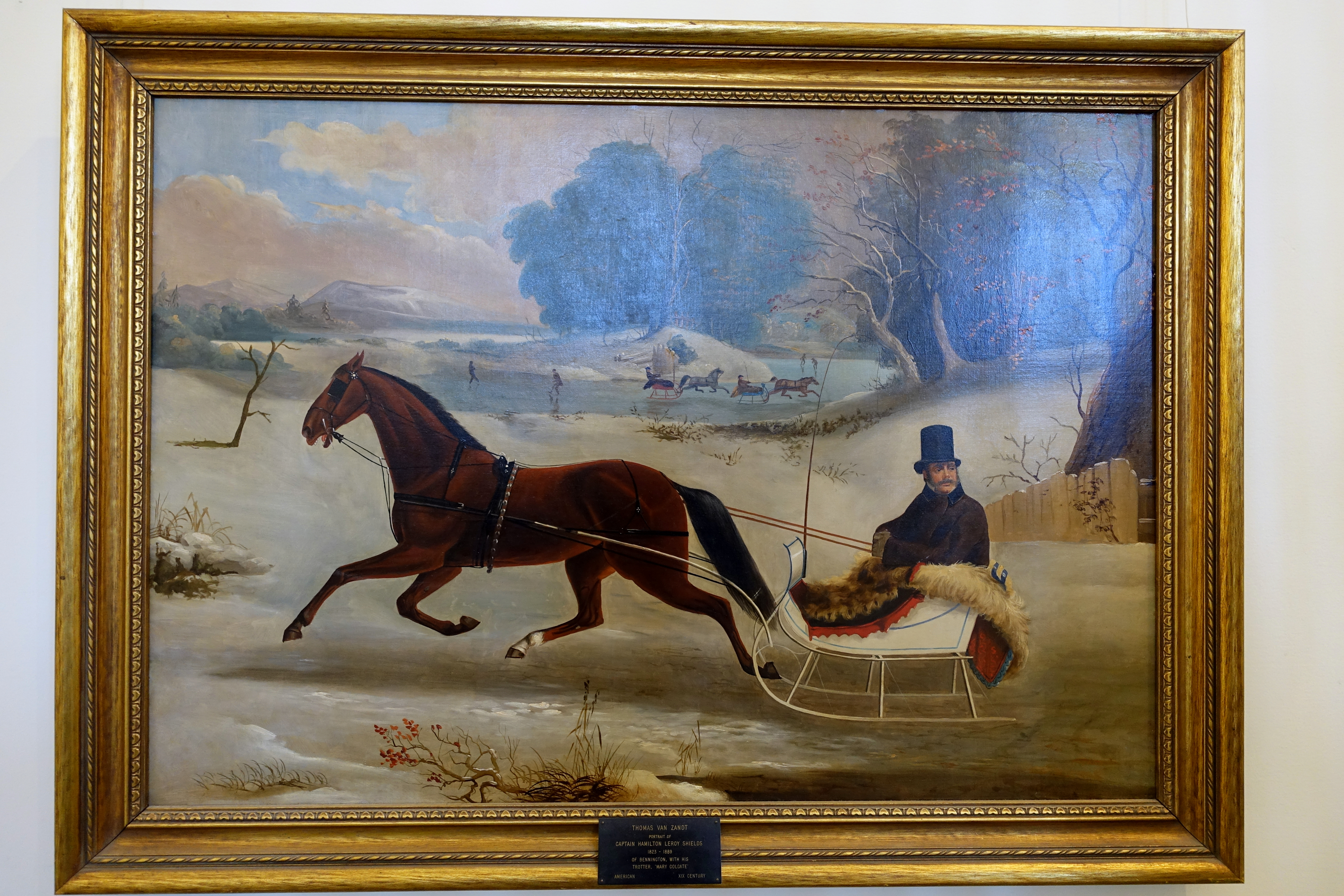
Captain Hamilton Leroy Shields of Bennington, with his trotter Mary Colgate, by Thomas Van Zandt

Hamilton Leroy Shields (November 1, 1823 – November 24, 1889) was an attorney and farmer active in New York City and Bennington, Vermont.

Shields was born to William Cannon Shields and Elizabeth Finch in Norfolk, Virginia, studied at the Virginia Military Institute from 1839–1841 and then the United States Military Academy from 1841–1846, and subsequently served in the Mexican–American War, where he was eventually made captain. In 1851 he married Caroline Hart, of Troy, New York. Shields served as judge-advocate in the Eastern Division of the Army until 1853, resigned his commission in 1854, and became an attorney in New York City. In 1857 he moved to Bennington, Vermont.
