= Albany Rural Cemetery =

Historic cemetery in New York, United States

- U.S. National Register of Historic Places
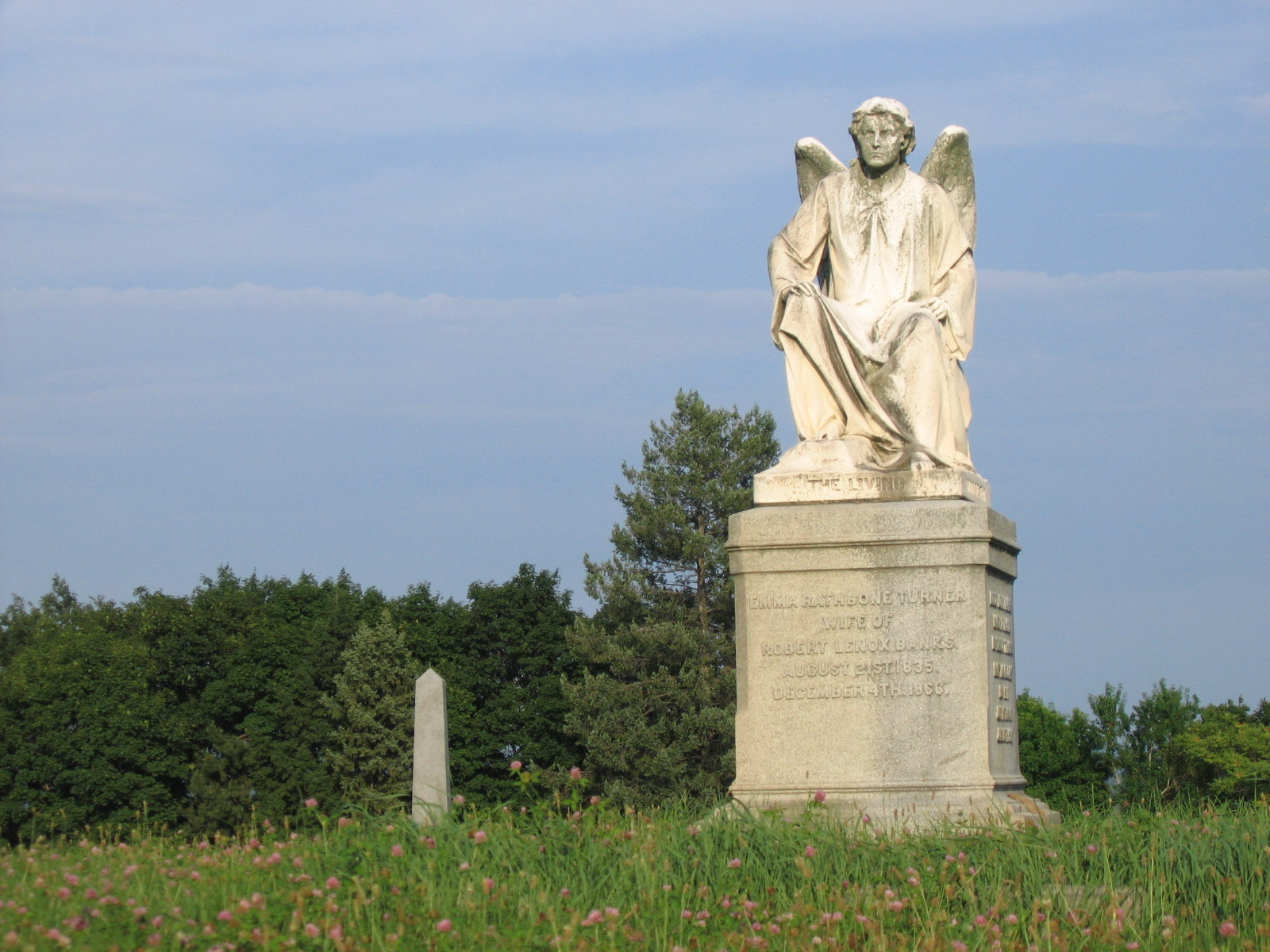

- Location within New York Location within the United States
- Interactive map of Albany Rural Cemetery
- Location: Cemetery Ave. Menands, New York
- Coordinates: 42°42′24″N 73°44′8″W
- Area: 467 acres (189 ha)
- Built: 1844
- Architect: Douglass, Maj. D.B.
- Architectural style: Queen Anne
- NRHP reference No.: 79001566
- Added to NRHP: October 25, 1979

The Albany Rural Cemetery was established October 7, 1844, in Menands, New York, United States, just outside the city of Albany, New York. It is renowned as one of the most beautiful, pastoral cemeteries in the U.S., at over 400 acres (1.6 km^{2}). Many historical American figures are buried there.

== History ==
On April 2, 1841, an association was formed to bring the cemetery into being. A committee of the association selected the site on April 20, 1844. The cemetery originally contained 100 acres (0.40 km^{2}). This portion was consecrated October 7, 1844. Daniel D. Barnard delivered the dedication address, which was one of many given at rural cemeteries across the northeast in the years from Justice Joseph Story's address at Mount Auburn Cemetery in 1831 to Lincoln's Gettysburg Address in 1863. The first interment was made in May, 1845. Located near the entrance is the Louis Menand House.

David Bates Douglass, a military and civilian engineer, working in the capacity as a consulting architect, designed the landscape layout of Albany Rural Cemetery, between 1845 and 1846. He modeled his design of the Albany Rural Cemetery, as well as his subsequent and final one, Mount Hermon Cemetery, in a rural area outside of Quebec City, Canada East, upon his first design, the highly acclaimed Green-Wood Cemetery, in what at the time was a rural section of Brooklyn. All three of Douglass' garden cemeteries have been conferred a historic status, by their respective jurisdictions.

In 1868, bodies from other cemeteries were removed and reinterred in Albany Rural Cemetery.

== Notable burials ==
The cemetery has a number of notable burials, particularly of 19th century New York State politicians and industrialists, and figures relating to the history of the Adirondack Park.

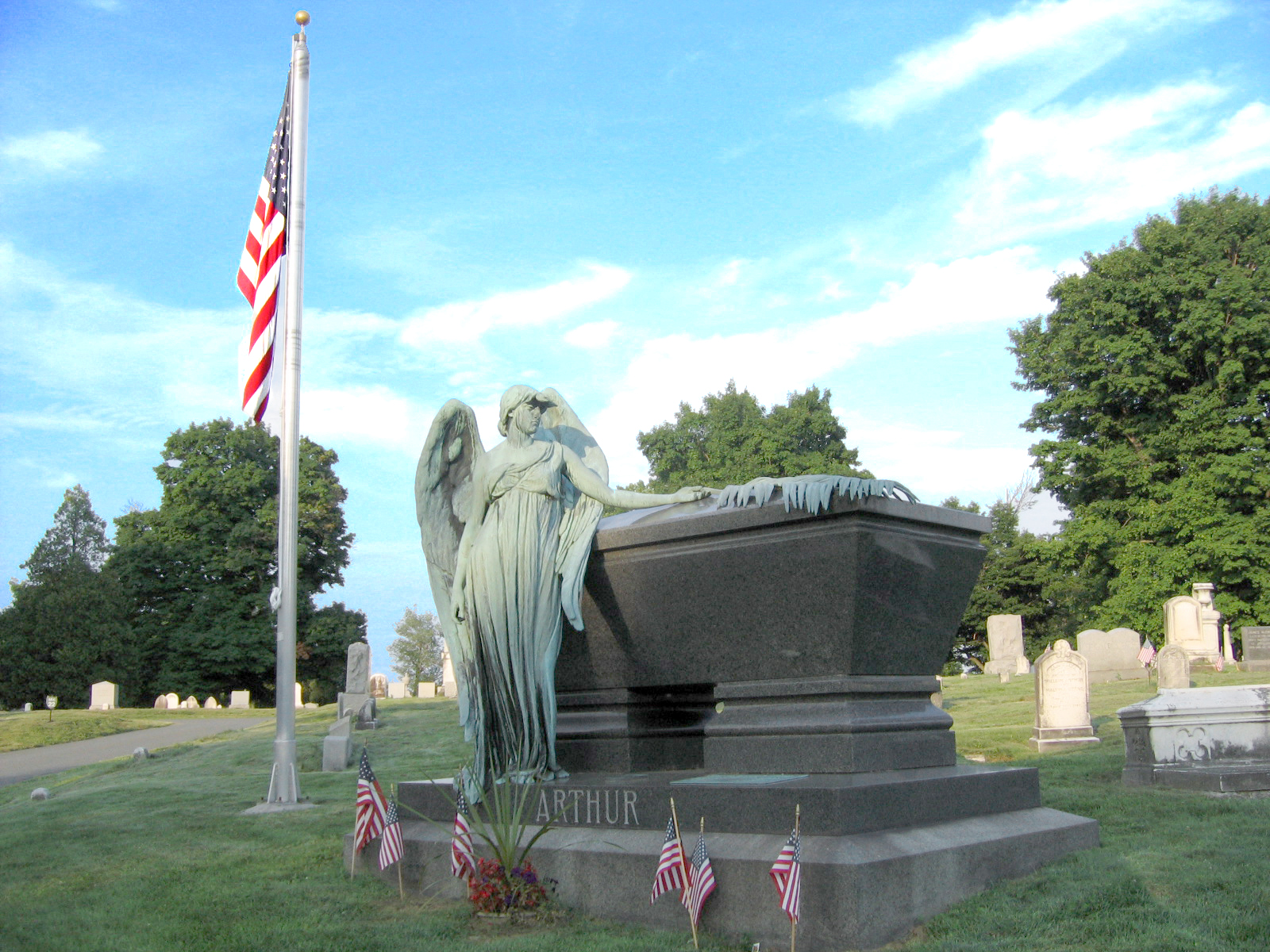
Grave of President Chester A. Arthur

- President Chester A. Arthur (1829–1886) – the 21st President of the United States, was interred with his wife Ellen Lewis Herndon Arthur, (1837–1880). His memorial was designed by Ephraim Keyser and dedicated on June 15, 1889.
- Erastus Corning (1794–1872) – Founder and president of the New York Central Railroad.
- Erastus Corning 2nd (1909–1983) – Great-grandson of Erastus Corning and the mayor of Albany for 41 years. He is also in the Corning family plot.
- Anne Darling (1913–1991) – Actor best known as the shepherdess in Bride of Frankenstein.
- John G. Farnsworth (1832–1895) – Adjutant General of New York
- Charles Fort (1874–1932) – American writer and researcher who specialized in anomalous phenomena.
- Peter Gansevoort (1749–1812) – Colonel in the Continental Army and later a brigadier general in the US Army. Known for leading the defense of Fort Stanwix during the Saratoga Campaign.
- Eugenia Gibson (1856/57 - 1945) – Missionary and educator
- Jack Gwillim (1909–2001) – English character actor well-known for having portrayed Poseidon in Clash of the Titans.
- James Hall Jr. (1811–1898) – Geologist and paleontologist.
- Learned Hand (1872–1961) – Judge on the U.S. District Court for the Southern District of New York from 1909 to 1924 and on the U.S. Court of Appeals for the Second Circuit from 1924 to his death.
- Lansing Hotaling (1839–1909) – District Attorney of Albany County and member of the New York State Assembly
- Edward Burton Hughes (1905–1987) – Acting Commissioner of New York State Department of Transportation in 1969, Executive Deputy Commissioner of New York State Department of Transportation (1967–70), and Deputy Superintendent of New York State Department of Public Works (1952–1967). Upon his retirement in 1970 Hughes founded the E. Burton Hughes Achievement Award.
- Daniel Manning (1831–1887) – Journalist, politician and banker and served as Secretary of the Treasury under President Grover Cleveland.
- Mary Margaretta Fryer Manning (1844–1928) – President General of the Daughters of the American Revolution
- William Learned Marcy (1786–1857) – American statesman, who served as U.S. Senator, Governor of New York, U.S. Secretary of War and U.S. Secretary of State. When he died in 1857, relatives recalled that Marcy "frequently expressed the wish to be buried where he had spent so much time in reading and in contemplation".
- Erastus Dow Palmer (1817–1904) – Sculptor. He worked in an Albany studio producing statuary and portrait busts for many years.
- William Paterson (1745–1806) – U.S. Senator and Governor of New Jersey and a signatory to the Constitution of the United States. Paterson ended his career as an Associate Justice of the Supreme Court, serving until his death. He is interred in the same plot as his son-in-law, Stephen Van Rensselaer.
- Rufus Wheeler Peckham (1809–1873) – New York Court of Appeals judge and U.S. congressman who was lost at sea. There is a cenotaph in his honor in the Peckham family plot.
- Rufus Wheeler Peckham (1838–1909) – associate justice of the Supreme Court of the United States (1895–1909) – in the Peckham family plot.
- Wheeler Hazard Peckham (1833–1905) – Prominent New York City lawyer and a failed nominee to the Supreme Court. He is buried in the Peckham family plot.
- John F. Rathbone (1819–1901) – Industrialist and Adjutant General of New York
- Peggy Schuyler (1758–1801) – wife of Stephen Van Rensselaer, daughter of Philip Schuyler, sister-in-law to Alexander Hamilton.
- Philip Pieterse Schuyler (1628–1683) – progenitor of the Schuyler family, the Livingston family and the ancestor of the Bush family.
- Gilbert R. Spalding (1812–1880) – Showman and circus owner in the Spalding and Robbins family plot.
- Harriet Mabel Spalding (1862-1935), Poet and litterateur.
- Ambrose Spencer (1765–1848) – Mayor of Albany, attorney general of New York, US congressman.
- John Canfield Spencer (1788–1855) – Secretary of War and Secretary of the Treasury under President John Tyler and a failed nominee to the Supreme Court.
- Frances Starr (1886–1973) – American stage, film and television actress.
- Kate Stoneman (1841–1925) – An early 20th-century suffragist and the first woman admitted to the New York State Bar Association.
- Ebby Thacher (1896–1966) – an early member of Alcoholics Anonymous, the best friend and sponsor of the co-founder William Wilson (Bill W.)
- Franklin Townsend (1821–1898) – Industrialist, mayor of Albany, adjutant general of the state militia.
- John Van Buren (1810–1866) – son of President Martin Van Buren. John Van Buren, a handsome attorney known as "Prince John", died at sea on October 13, 1866, while on the voyage from Liverpool to New York. His grave is marked by an Italian marble cross.
- General Stephen Van Rensselaer (1764–1839) – the last patroon, who died in 1839, was founder of the scientific school which later became Rensselaer Polytechnic Institute.
- Thomas Kirby Van Zandt (1814–1886) – Painter of portraits, painter of scenes depicting animals, including dogs and horses.
- Alice Morgan Wright (1881–1975) – Modernist sculptor, co-founder of New York State League of Women Voters, Recording Secretary for Woman Suffrage Party, co-founder of the National Woman's Party, and Founder of the Humane Education Society.
- Thurlow Weed (1797–1882) – New York newspaper publisher and Whig and Republican politician; marked by a spire, corner lot.
- Edward J. Westcott (1873–1926) – Adjutant General of New York

== Commemorations ==
- Philip Schuyler – A 36-foot-high (11 m) doric column at Lot 2, Section 29 commemorates General Philip Schuyler, major general in the Continental Army, delegate to the Continental Congress, one of the first two United States senators elected from New York, and descendant of Philip Pieterse Schuyler.
- Two monuments within this cemetery incorporate works in bronze by the sculptor Oscar Lenz. Lenz created The Angel of The Resurrection and frieze on the Parsons family monument, as well as the relief of a seated warrior receiving a bouquet of poppies from the Angel of Death on George Porter Hilton's mausoleum.

== Gallery ==
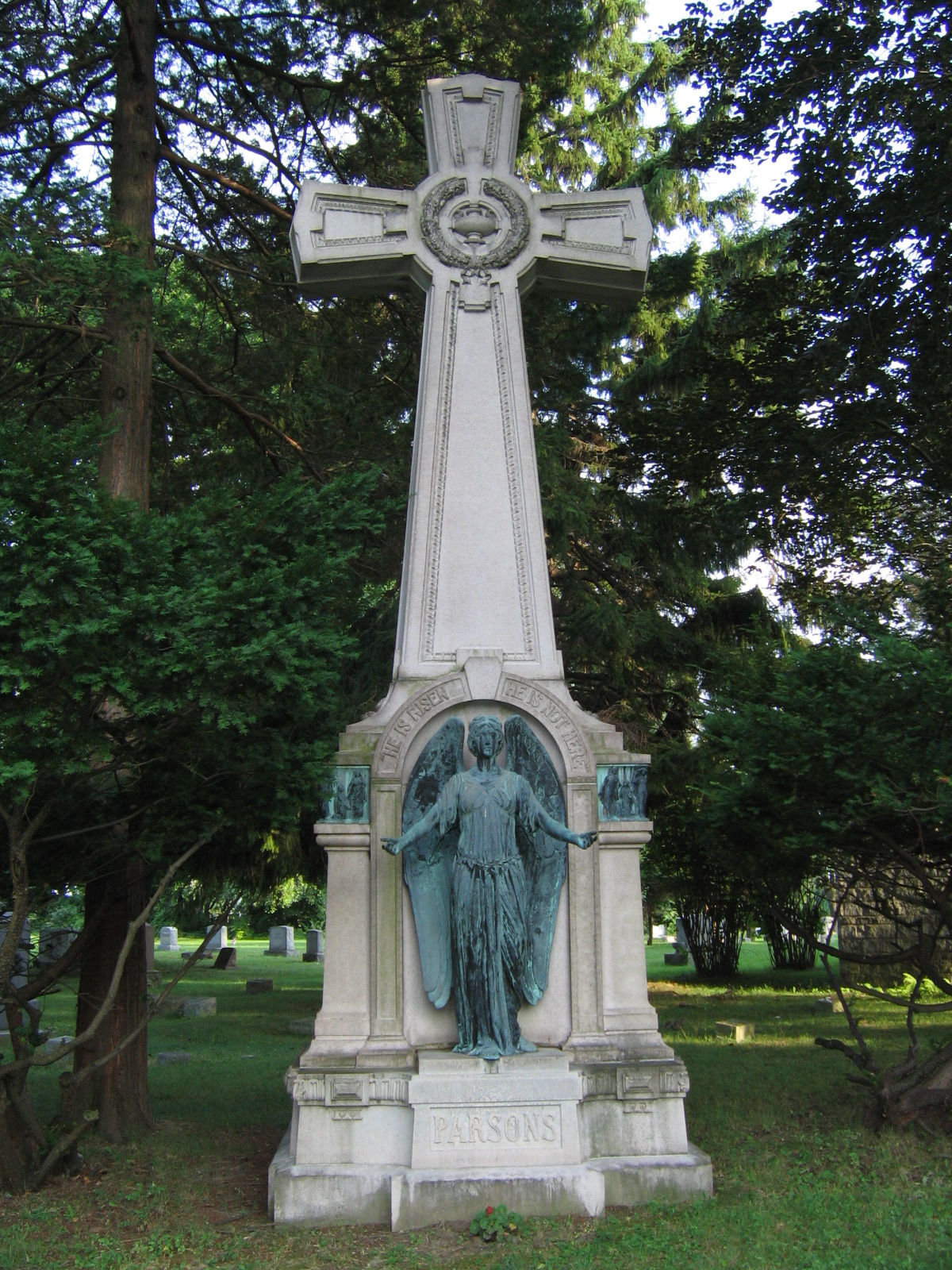
Angel sculpture by Oscar Lenz on Parsons family marker

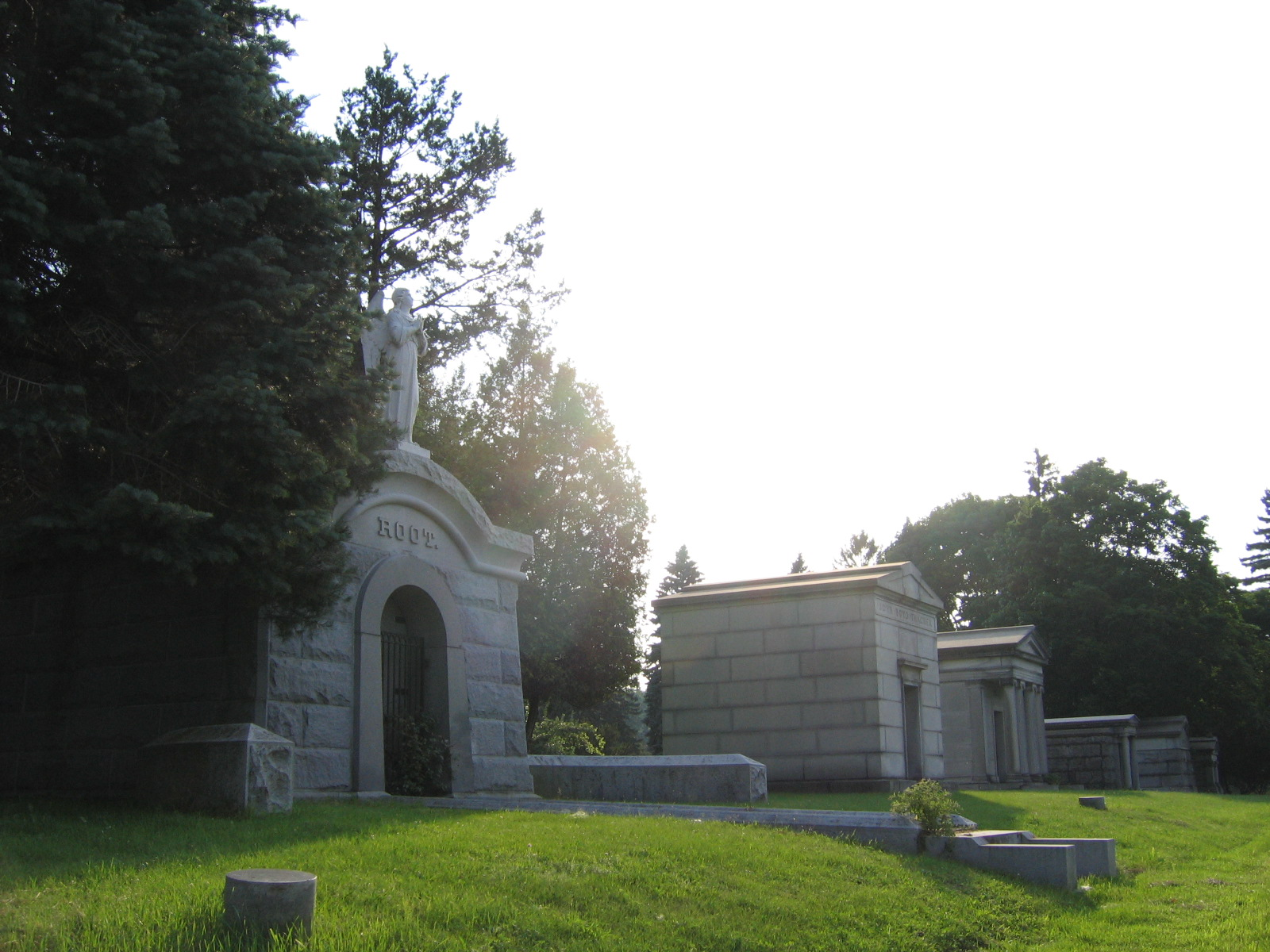
Mausoleums

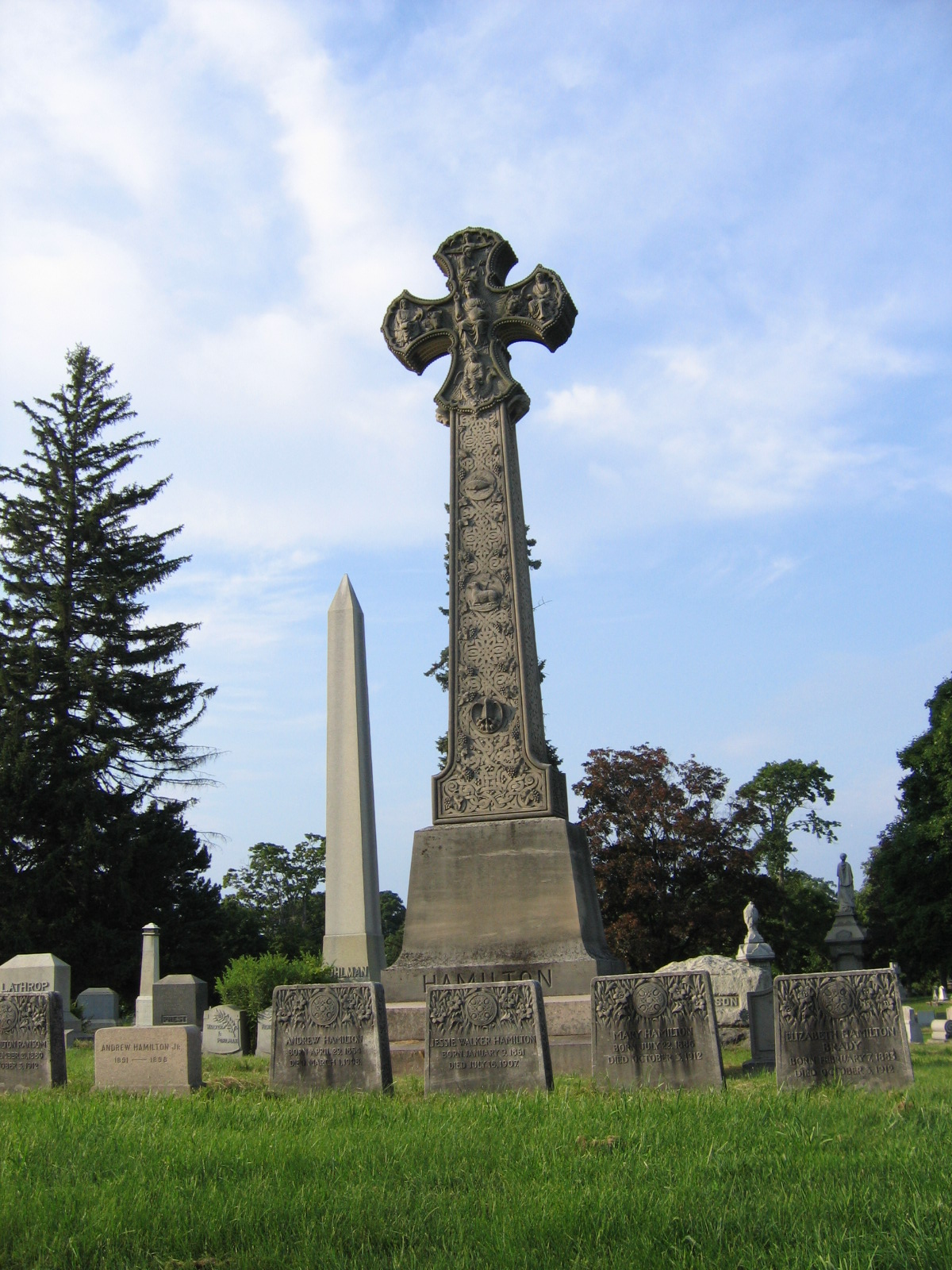
Hamilton family cross

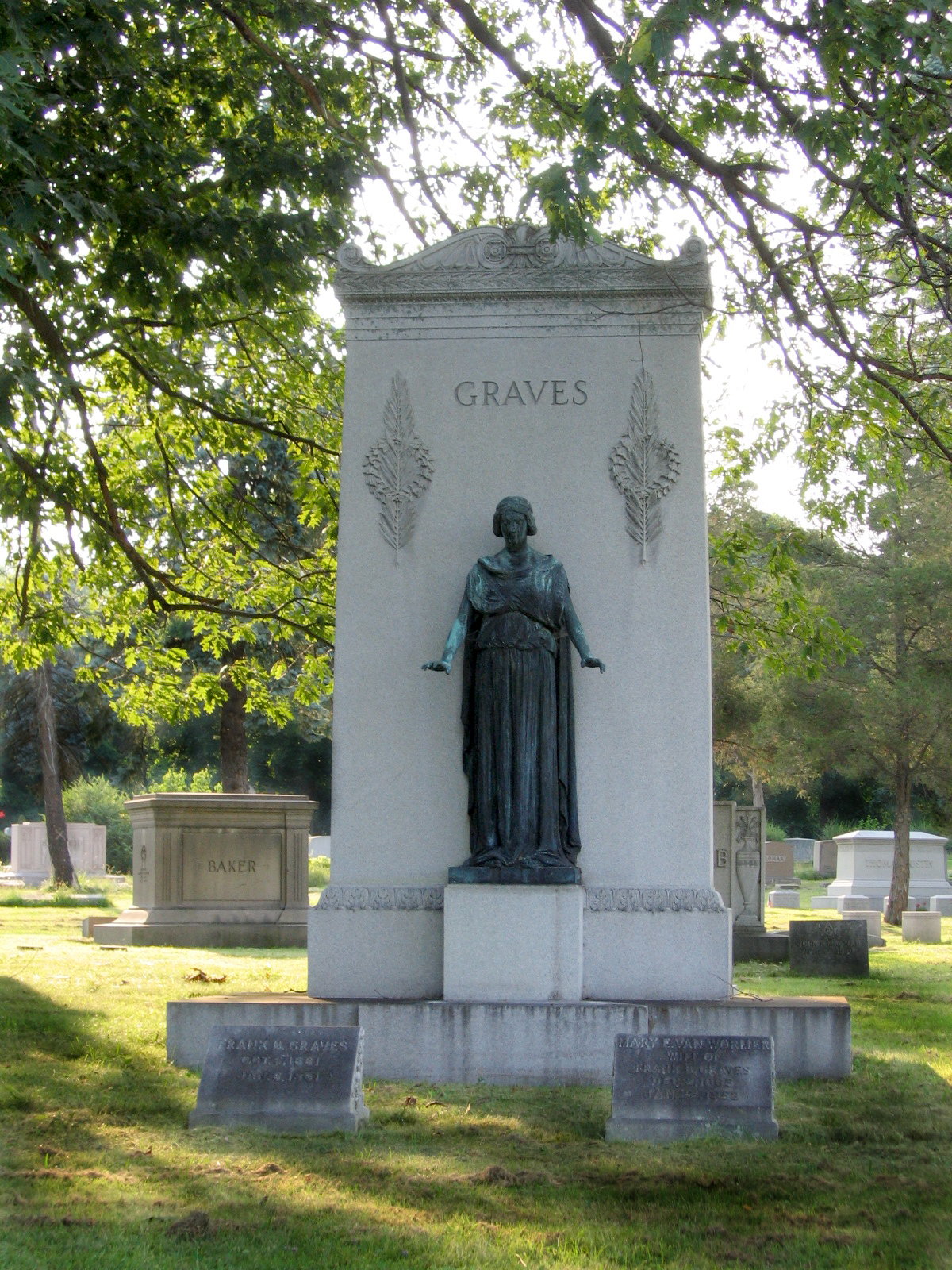
Graves family marker

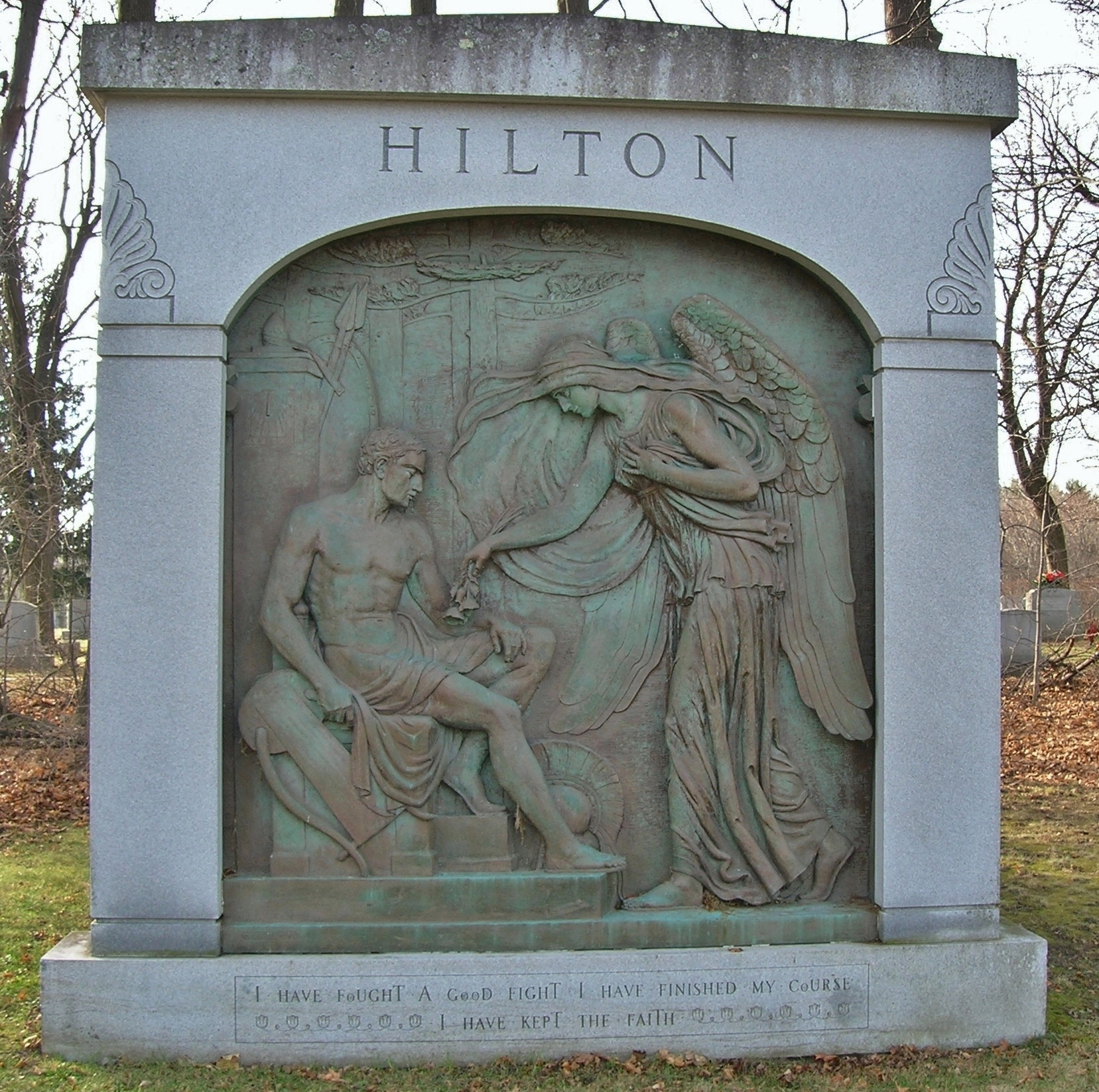
Oscar Lenz sculpture on the Hilton mausoleum, owners of Hilton Bridge & Construction Company.

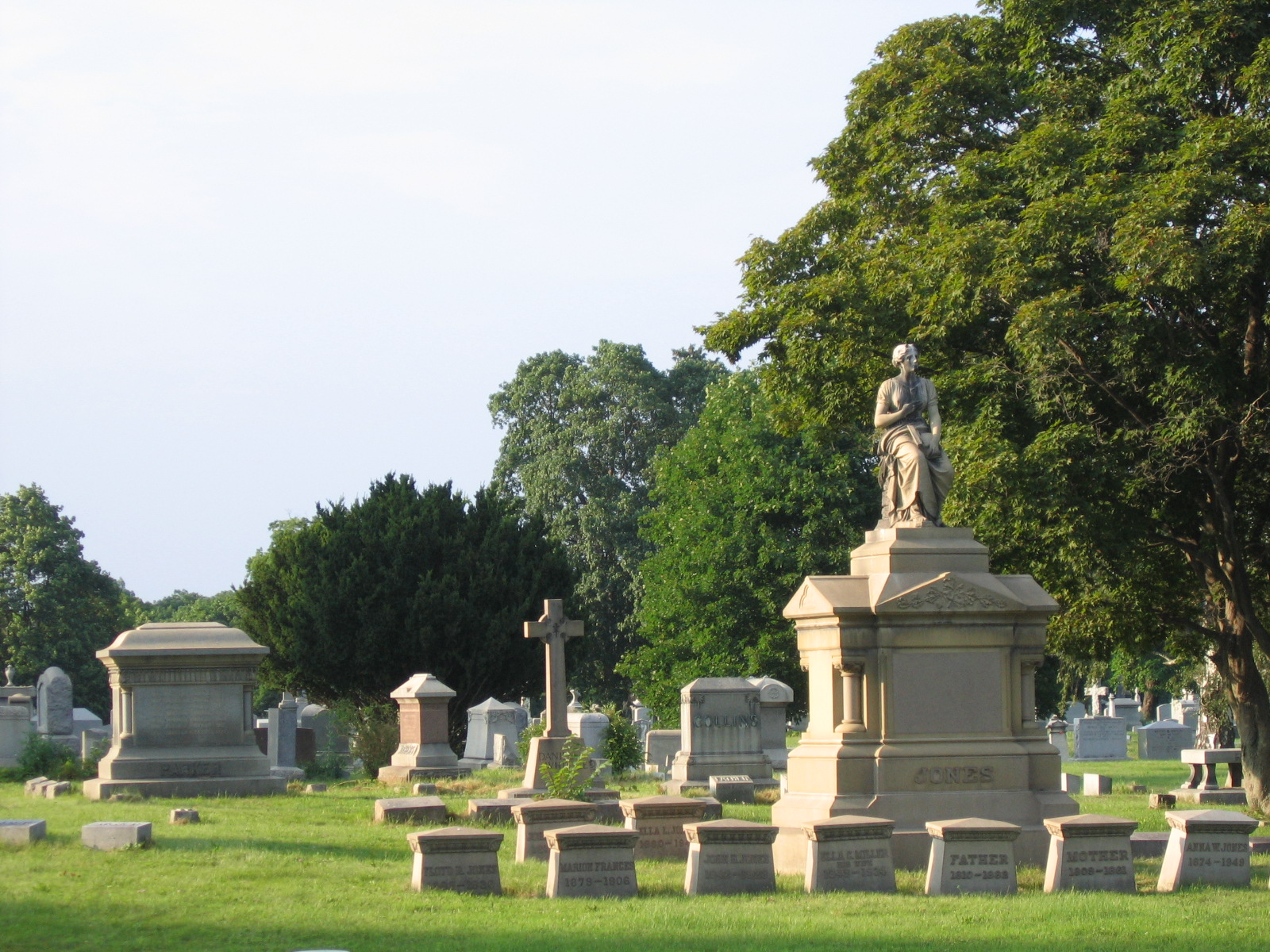

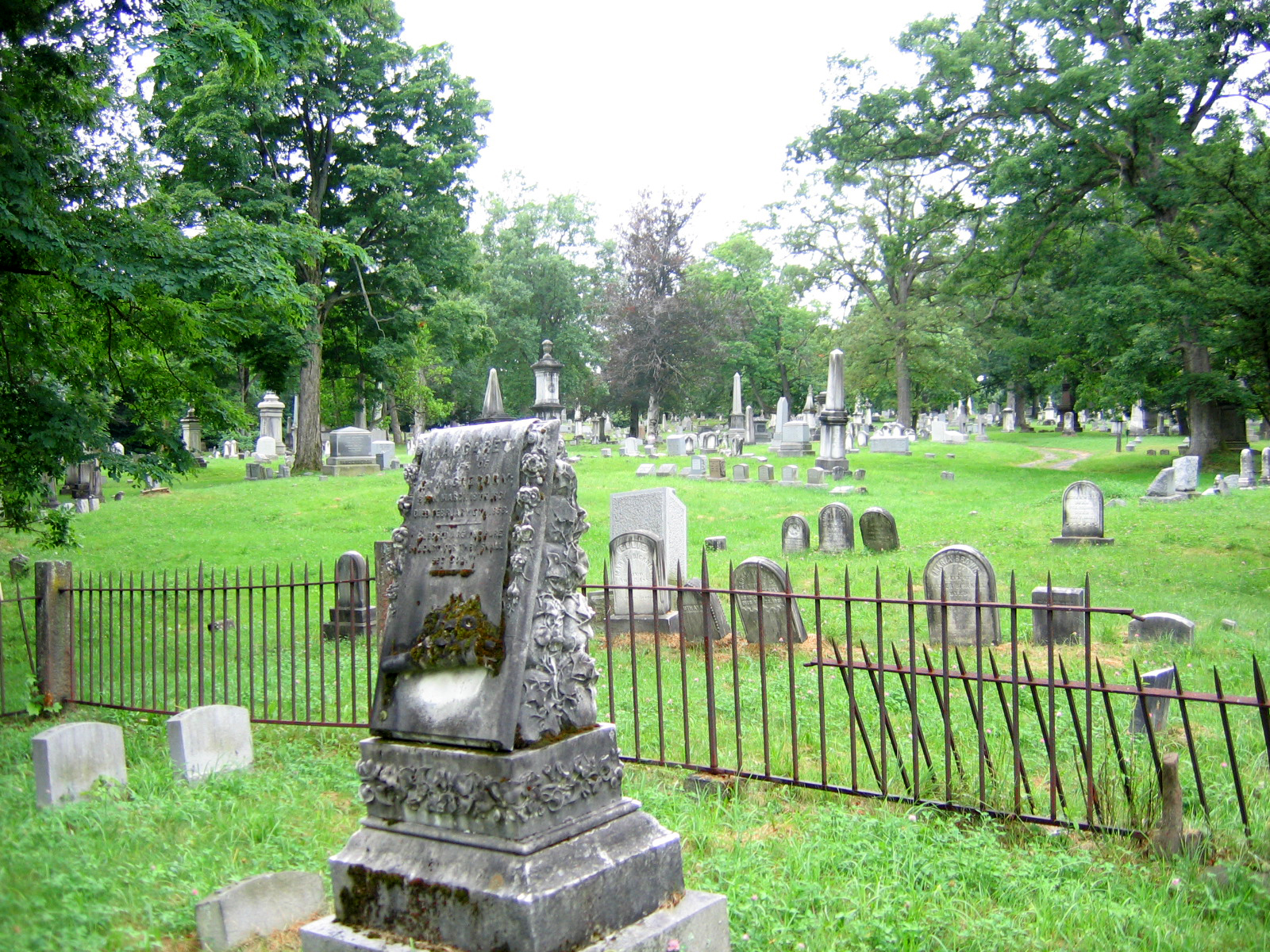
Grave of Margaret Gregory

== See also ==
- List of burial places of presidents and vice presidents of the United States
- List of burial places of justices of the Supreme Court of the United States
