= List of Medal of Honor recipients for the Battle of Cedar Creek =

The Battle of Cedar Creek was fought near Middletown, Virginia on October 19, 1864. The battle was the decisive engagement of Major General Philip Sheridan’s Valley Campaigns of 1864 and was the largest battle fought in the Shenandoah Valley. Twelve Union Army enlisted men and nine officers were awarded the Medal of Honor for gallantry during the battle.

The Medal of Honor was created during the American Civil War and is the highest military decoration presented by the United States government to a member of its armed forces. The recipient must have distinguished themselves at the risk of their own life above and beyond the call of duty in action against an enemy of the United States. Due to the nature of this medal, it is commonly presented posthumously.

== Recipients ==
Image	Name	Rank	Unit
	John W. Blunt	First Lieutenant	6th New York Cavalry
—	Henry H. Crocker	Captain	2nd Massachusetts Cavalry
—	Ulric L. Crocker	Private	6th Michigan Cavalry
	Henry A. du Pont	Captain	5th U.S. Artillery
—	Edwin Goodrich	First Lieutenant	9th New York Cavalry
—	William W. Henry	Colonel	10th U.S. Infantry
—	Ira Hough	Private	8th Indiana Infantry
—	George M. Love	Colonel	116th New York Infantry
—	Frederick Lyon	Corporal	1st Vermont Cavalry
—	Andrew J. McGonnigle	Captain	U.S. Volunteers
—	Harry J. Parks	Private	9th New York Cavalry
—	Daniel P. Reigle	Corporal	87th Pennsylvania Infantry
—	David H. Scofield	Quartermaster Sergeant	5th New York Cavalry
—	James Sweeney	Private	1st Vermont Cavalry
—	Richard Taylor	Private	18th Indiana Infantry
	Stephen Thomas	Colonel	8th Vermont Infantry
—	Amasa Tracy	Lieutenant Colonel	2nd Vermont Infantry
—	John Walsh	Corporal	5th New York Cavalry
—	Martin Wambsgan	Private	90th New York Infantry
—	Thomas M. Wells	Chief Bugler	6th New York Cavalry
—	Eri D. Woodbury	Sergeant	1st Vermont Cavalry
