= John B. Weber =

American politician

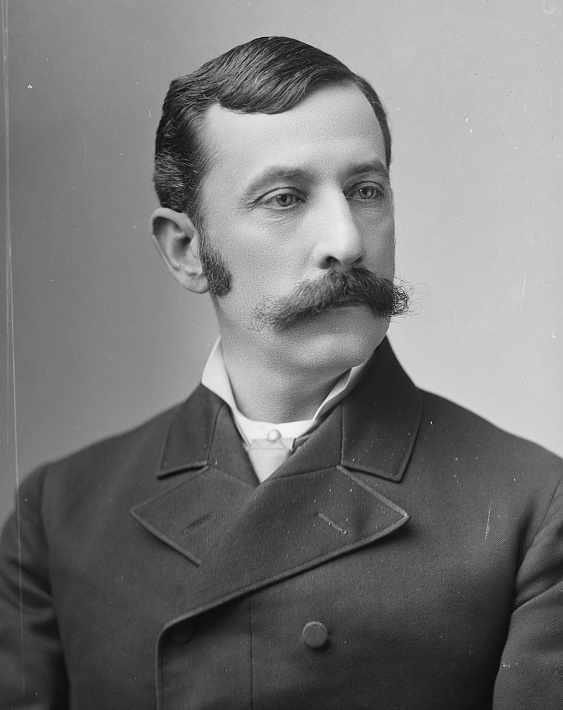
- Weber c. 1873–1890

18th Sheriff of Erie County
- In office January 1, 1874 – December 31, 1876
- Preceded by: Grover Cleveland
- Succeeded by: Joseph L. Haberstro

Member of the U.S. House of Representatives from New York's 33rd district
- In office March 4, 1885 – March 3, 1889
- Preceded by: Francis B. Brewer
- Succeeded by: John M. Wiley

Personal details
- Born: September 21, 1842 Buffalo, New York, U.S.
- Died: December 18, 1926 (aged 84) Lackawanna, New York, U.S.
- Buried: Forest Lawn Cemetery, Buffalo, New York
- Other works: Assistant Postmaster of Buffalo 1871–1873; Republican National Convention delegate 1888; First Commissioner of Immigration at the Port of New York 1890–1893; Grade-crossing commissioner of Buffalo 1888–1908; Commissioner General of the Pan-American Exposition 1901; Chairman of the Erie County Home Defense Committee during World War I

Military service
- Allegiance: (United States) United States; Union
- Branch/service: (United States) Union Army
- Years of service: August 7, 1861 – 1864
- Rank: Colonel
- Unit: 44th New York Infantry Regiment; 116th New York Infantry Regiment
- Commands: 89th U.S. Colored Troops Infantry Regiment; 2nd Bde., 2nd Div., Corps d'Afrique, Department of the Gulf
- Battles/wars: American Civil War: Battle of Yorktown; Battle of Hanover Court House; Seven Days Battle; Battle of Gaines' Mill; Battle of Malvern Hill; Battle of Gettysburg; Red River Campaign

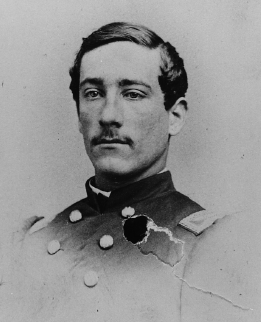
Weber in 1862

John Baptiste Weber (September 21, 1842 – December 18, 1926) was a U.S. representative from New York. He served as a Union Army officer during the American Civil War and held various offices in the state.

== Early life ==
Weber was born at his parents' cottage on Oak Street in Buffalo, New York. His parents, Philippe Jacob Weber and Mary Anne Weber (née Young), had emigrated to the United States in 1833 from Leutenheim, in Alsace, France, and settled in Buffalo. John was the youngest boy in a family of four children. He started attending Public School #4 at the age of four. His education continued through the Central School of Buffalo when he began to work as an "errand boy".

In 1856, at the age of 14, John Weber joined the New York State Militia. He served in Company F of the 65th regiment as their color guard.

== Civil War service ==
Weber enlisted in the Civil War as a private in the 44th New York Infantry Regiment on August 7, 1861. By August 30, he had been promoted to the rank of corporal. On January 2, 1862, Corporal Weber was again promoted to the rank of sergeant.

During the Battle of Yorktown, on April 3, 1862, Weber was promoted from sergeant of Company A to sergeant major.

Following Lieutenant Weber's service in the Forty-fourth Regiment, he was promoted to first lieutenant and appointed adjutant of the newly formed 116th New York Infantry Regiment by Colonel Edward Payson Chapin. During this time, in the summer of 1862, Lieutenant Weber helped with recruiting.

=== 89th United States Colored Infantry ===
On September 19, 1863, Weber attained the rank of colonel, two days before his twenty-first birthday, when he accepted command of the 89th U.S. Colored Troops Infantry Regiment. He chose the appointment to the colored regiment over the appointment to a Massachusetts regiment. The 89th regiment was organized out of Port Hudson, Louisiana between October 8 and November 9, 1863, being designated the "18th Infantry, Corps d'Afrique". Early in 1864, during the Red River Campaign, Weber had the majority of his men reassigned leaving him only a handful. To rebuild his numbers he was promised replacements from the slaves that were expected to be liberated during the campaign. These replacements were never acquired and Weber learned from a member of General Banks staff that his unit was to be consolidated. Rather than waiting to be discharged, Weber offered his resignation and returned to Buffalo arriving on July 8, 1864. The war ended before he received another command.

After the war, Colonel Weber was elected as a companion of the New York Commandery of the Military Order of the Loyal Legion of the United States.

== From Congressman to Commissioner of Ellis Island ==
Following the war, Weber began his involvement in politics. His early efforts involved helping to organize the Republican Third Ward "Grant Club" and serving as its president in 1867. The Third Ward Grant Club was involved in the presidential run of General Ulysses S. Grant in 1868. In the area of local politics, Weber helped to reform the rules for the election of county committeemen. The reforms gave voters a greater share in selecting candidates for these offices.

He served as assistant postmaster of Buffalo 1871–1873. Sheriff of Erie County 1874–1876.

He engaged in the wholesale grocery business.

At the Republican Convention for the Thirty-third Congressional District, held at Niagara Falls, New York on September 3, 1884, John Weber was decided upon by a vote of 10–8 to be the Republican candidate for the Congressional seat. Weber was elected as a Republican to the Forty-ninth and Fiftieth Congresses (March 4, 1885 – March 3, 1889). He was unsuccessful when he sought reelection in 1888 for a seat in the Fifty-first Congress.

He served as delegate to the Republican National Convention at Chicago in 1888. Weber was appointed the Grade-Crossing Commissioner of the city of Buffalo. He held this post from 1888 to 1908.

In 1890, Weber was appointed as the first Commissioner of Immigration at the port of New York. On the opening day of Ellis Island, January 1, 1892, he gave a $10 gold Liberty coin to 17-year-old Annie Moore, who was the first foreigner to pass U.S. federal immigrant inspection at Ellis Island. He held this position until 1893. He also served as commissioner general of the Pan-American Exposition at Buffalo in 1901.

== Death ==
Weber died at home on Abbott Road in Lackawanna, New York, on December 18, 1926, at the age of 84. He was interred at Forest Lawn Cemetery in Buffalo, New York. The grave marker is inscribed "Colonel 89th U.S. Infantry".

== Honors ==
In Lackawanna, the local Veterans of Foreign Wars Post is named after Colonel Weber.

== See also ==
- Lackawanna, New York

== Citations ==
- United States Congress. "John B. Weber (id: W000236)". Biographical Directory of the United States Congress.

U.S. House of Representatives
| Preceded by Francis B. Brewer | Member of the U.S. House of Representatives from New York's 33rd congressional district 1885–1889 | Succeeded by John M. Wiley |
