= George M. Love =

U.S. Medal of Honor recipient

George Maltby Love
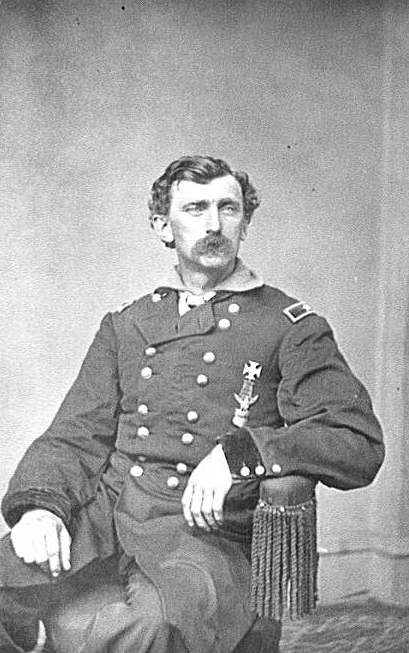
- Born: January 1, 1831; New York City
- Died: March 15, 1887 (aged 56); Buffalo, New York
- Burial place: Forest Lawn Cemetery, Buffalo, New York
- Military career
- Allegiance: United States; Union
- Branch: United States Army; Union Army
- Service years: 1861–1865; 1867–1883
- Rank: Colonel; Brevet Brigadier General
- Nickname: Georgey
- Units: (New York (state)) 21st New York Volunteer Infantry (New York (state)) 44th New York Volunteer Infantry (New York (state)) 116th New York Volunteer Infantry
- Commands: 116th New York Volunteer Infantry
- Conflicts: American Civil War
- Awards: Medal of Honor

George Maltby Love (January 1, 1831 – March 15, 1887) was a colonel in the Union Army and a Medal of Honor recipient for his actions in the American Civil War.

== Civil War ==
George Love enlisted in the 21st New York Volunteer Infantry on May 9, 1861, and was mustered in as the regiment's Sergeant Major on May 13, 1861. He served in that duty until August 23, 1861, when he was transferred to the 44th New York Infantry and promoted to first lieutenant of Company A. He was promoted to captain of Company A on January 2, 1862, and led his troops through the spring and summer of that year. On September 5, 1862, he was again promoted and transferred, to major of the 116th New York Volunteer Infantry. On July 16, 1863, he was promoted to colonel of the 116th New York Infantry, replacing Colonel Edward Payson Chapin, who was killed in action. While in command of his men during the October 19, 1864 Battle of Cedar Creek, Virginia, he captured the battle flag of the 2nd South Carolina Infantry Regiment, for which he was awarded the Medal of Honor on March 6, 1865.

On March 7, 1865, President Abraham Lincoln nominated Love for appointment to the brevet grade of Brigadier General of volunteers to rank from March 7, 1865, to rank from March 7, 1865, and the U.S. Senate confirmed the appointment on March 10, 1865. Love was honorably mustered out of the volunteer service on June 8, 1865.

== Later life and death ==
Love enlisted in the Regular Army in 1867 and was commissioned a Second Lieutenant in the 11th United States Infantry. Retiring as a First Lieutenant in 1883, he received brevets up to Lieutenant Colonel, US Regular Army. Not much is known about his life after retiring. George Maltby Love died in Buffalo, New York, of natural causes on March 15, 1887, at the age of 56. He was buried in Forest Lawn Cemetery, Buffalo, New York. His resting place lies only a few feet from where President Millard Fillmore is buried.

== Medal of Honor citation ==
Rank and organization: Colonel, 116th New York Infantry. Place and date: At Cedar Creek, Va., October 19, 1864. Entered service at: New York. Birth: New York. Date of issue: March 6, 1865.

Citation:

Capture of battle flag of 2d South Carolina (C.S.A.).

== See also ==
- List of Medal of Honor recipients for the Battle of Cedar Creek
- List of American Civil War Medal of Honor recipients: G–L
