= Henry Crocker =

Henry Crocker may refer to:

- Henry Radcliffe Crocker (1846–1909), English dermatologist
- Henry H. Crocker (1839–1913), Union Army officer and Medal of Honor recipient
- Henry J. Crocker (1861–1912), San Franciscan businessman and philatelist
