= Thomas J. Ward =

American soldier (1837–1924)

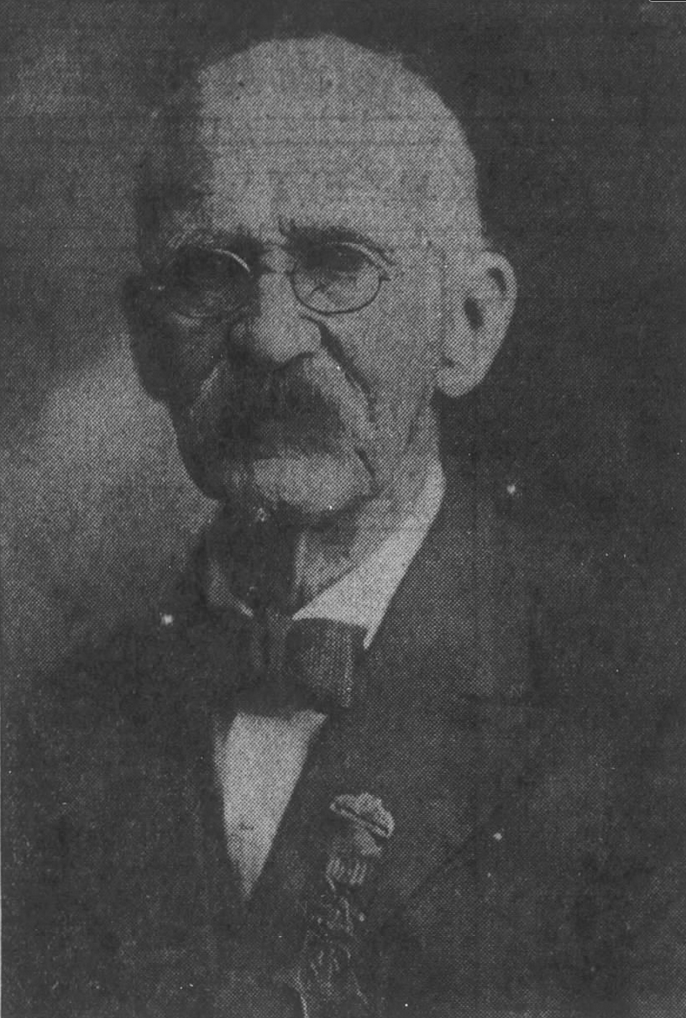
- Born: August 18, 1837; Romney, West Virginia
- Died: March 30, 1924 (aged 86); Anaconda, Montana
- Burial place: Anaconda, Montana
- Military career
- Allegiance: United States of America
- Branch: United States Army
- Rank: Sergeant Major
- Units: Company C, 116th Illinois Volunteer Infantry Regiment
- Conflicts: Siege of Vicksburg; American Civil War
- Awards: Medal of Honor

Thomas J. Ward (August 18, 1837 – March 30, 1924) was an American soldier who fought in the American Civil War. Ward received his country's highest award for bravery during combat, the Medal of Honor. Ward's medal was won for his heroism in the Siege of Vicksburg, Mississippi on May 22, 1863. He was honored with the award on July 31, 1896.

Ward was born in Romney, West Virginia, and entered service in Decatur, Illinois. He died at his home in Anaconda, Montana on March 30, 1924, and was buried in Upper Hill Cemetery.

== Medal of Honor citation ==
The President of the United States of America, in the name of Congress, takes pleasure in presenting the Medal of Honor to Private Thomas J. Ward, United States Army, for gallantry in the charge of the volunteer storming party on 22 May 1863, while serving with Company C, 116th Illinois Infantry, in action at Vicksburg, Mississippi.

== See also ==
- List of American Civil War Medal of Honor recipients: T–Z
