= Francis B. Brewer =

American politician (1820–1892)

Francis Beattie Brewer
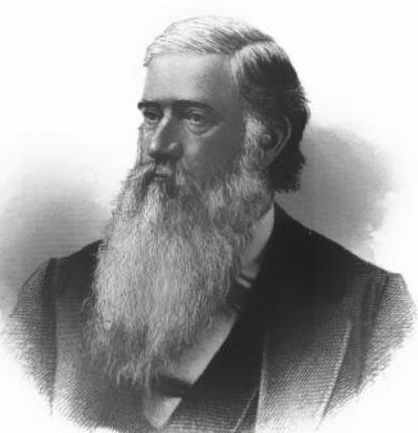

Member of the U.S. House of Representatives from New York's 33rd district
- In office March 4, 1883 – March 3, 1885
- Preceded by: Henry Van Aernam
- Succeeded by: John B. Weber

Member of the New York State Assembly from the Chautauqua County, 1st district
- In office January 1, 1873 – December 31, 1874
- Preceded by: Matthew P. Bemus
- Succeeded by: Otis D. Hinckley

Personal details
- Born: October 8, 1820 Keene, New Hampshire, U.S.
- Died: July 29, 1892 (aged 71) Westfield, New York, U.S.
- Citizenship: United States
- Party: Republican
- Education: Dartmouth College, Hanover, New Hampshire
- Profession: physician; politician; banker; manufacturer; farmer

Military service
- Allegiance: United States of America
- Branch/service: United States Army
- Rank: Major
- Battles/wars: Civil War

Francis Beattie Brewer (October 8, 1820 – July 29, 1892) was a physician and an American politician and a U.S. representative from New York.

== Biography ==
Born in Keene, New Hampshire, Brewer was the son of Ebenezer and Julia Emerson Brewer and attended the Barnet, Vermont public schools, Newbury (Vermont) Seminary, and Kimball Union Academy in Meriden, New Hampshire. He was graduated from Dartmouth College, Hanover, New Hampshire, in 1843 and from the medical department of the same institution in 1846. He married Caroline Elizabeth Selden.

== Career ==
Brewer practiced medicine in Barnet, Vermont, Plymouth, Massachusetts, and Titusville, Pennsylvania, from 1849 to 1861. He was a pioneer oil operator and lumberman in Titusville. He moved to Westfield, New York, in 1861 and engaged in banking, manufacturing, and agricultural pursuits.

During the Civil War, Brewer was a state military agent with the rank of major. He served as member of the board of supervisors of Chautauqua County, New York from 1868 to 1879, and was a delegate to the 1872 Republican National Convention. He served a member of the New York State Assembly (Chautauqua County, 1st District) in 1873 and 1874. He was the government director of the Union Pacific Railroad for four years under Presidents Grant and Hayes. He was appointed manager of the state insane asylum, Buffalo, New York, in 1881.

Elected as a Republican to the Forty-eighth Congress Brewer was United States Representative for the thirty-third district of New York from March 4, 1883 to March 3, 1885. Not a candidate for reelection in 1884. He resumed the practice of medicine.

== Death ==
Brewer died in Westfield, Chautauqua County, New York, on July 29, 1892 (age 71 years, 295 days). He is interred at Allegheny Cemetery, Pittsburgh, Pennsylvania.

New York State Assembly
Preceded by Matthew P. Bemus	New York State Assembly; Chautauqua County, 1st district 1873-1874	Succeeded by Otis D. Hinckley
U.S. House of Representatives
Preceded by Henry Van Aernam	Member of the U.S. House of Representatives from New York's 33rd congressional district 1883–1885	Succeeded by John B. Weber
