= Los Angeles National Cemetery =

Veterans cemetery in Los Angeles, California

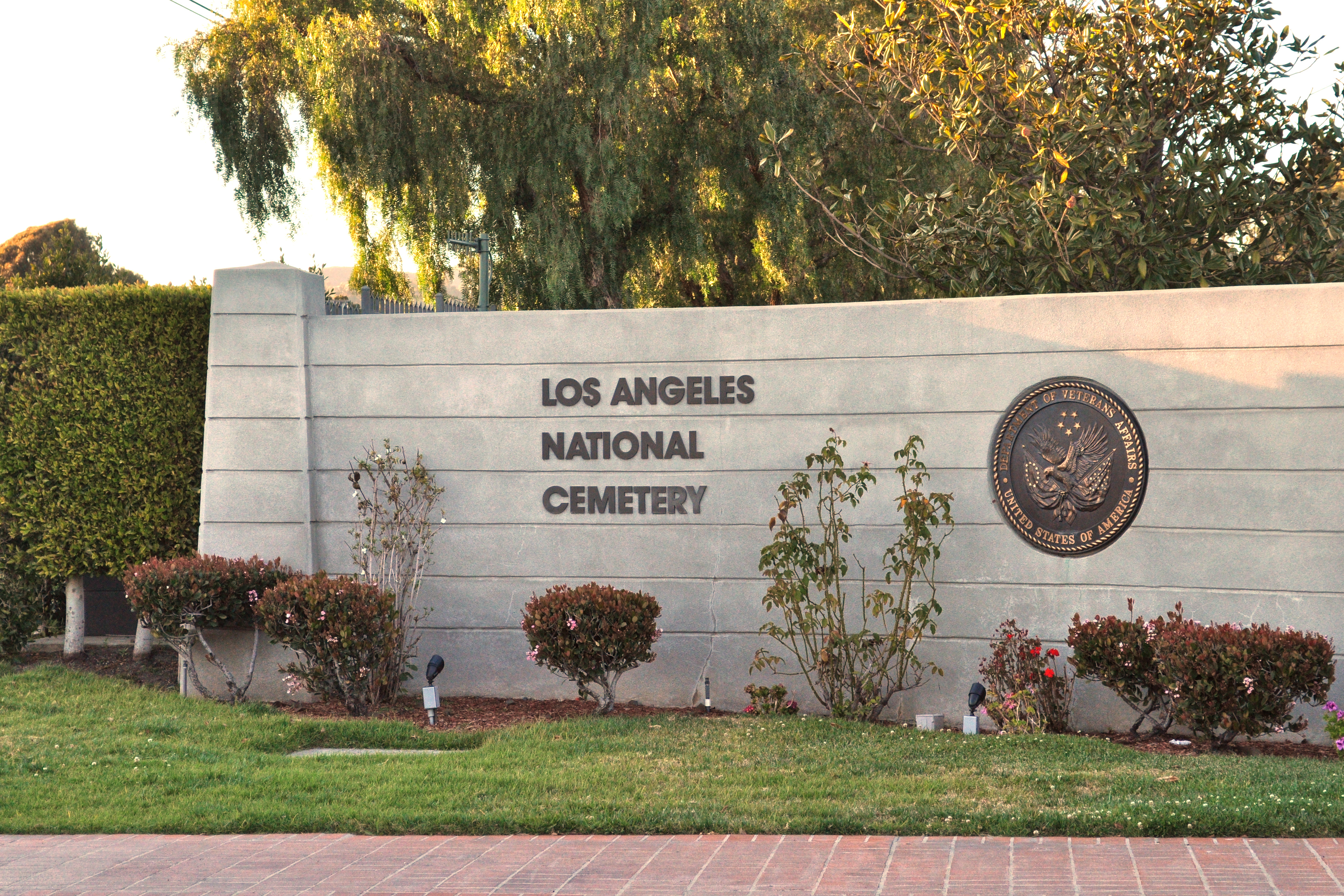
- Cemetery entrance
- Interactive map of Los Angeles National Cemetery

Details
- Established: 1889
- Location: Sepulveda Boulevard and Wilshire Boulevard; Los Angeles, California, US
- Country: US
- Coordinates: 34°03′40″N 118°27′12″W
- Type: Public
- Owned by: US Department of Veterans Affairs
- Size: 114 acres (46 ha) developed; 13 acres (5.3 ha) under development
- No. of interments: >85,000
- Website: www.cem.va.gov/CEM/cems/nchp/losangeles.asp

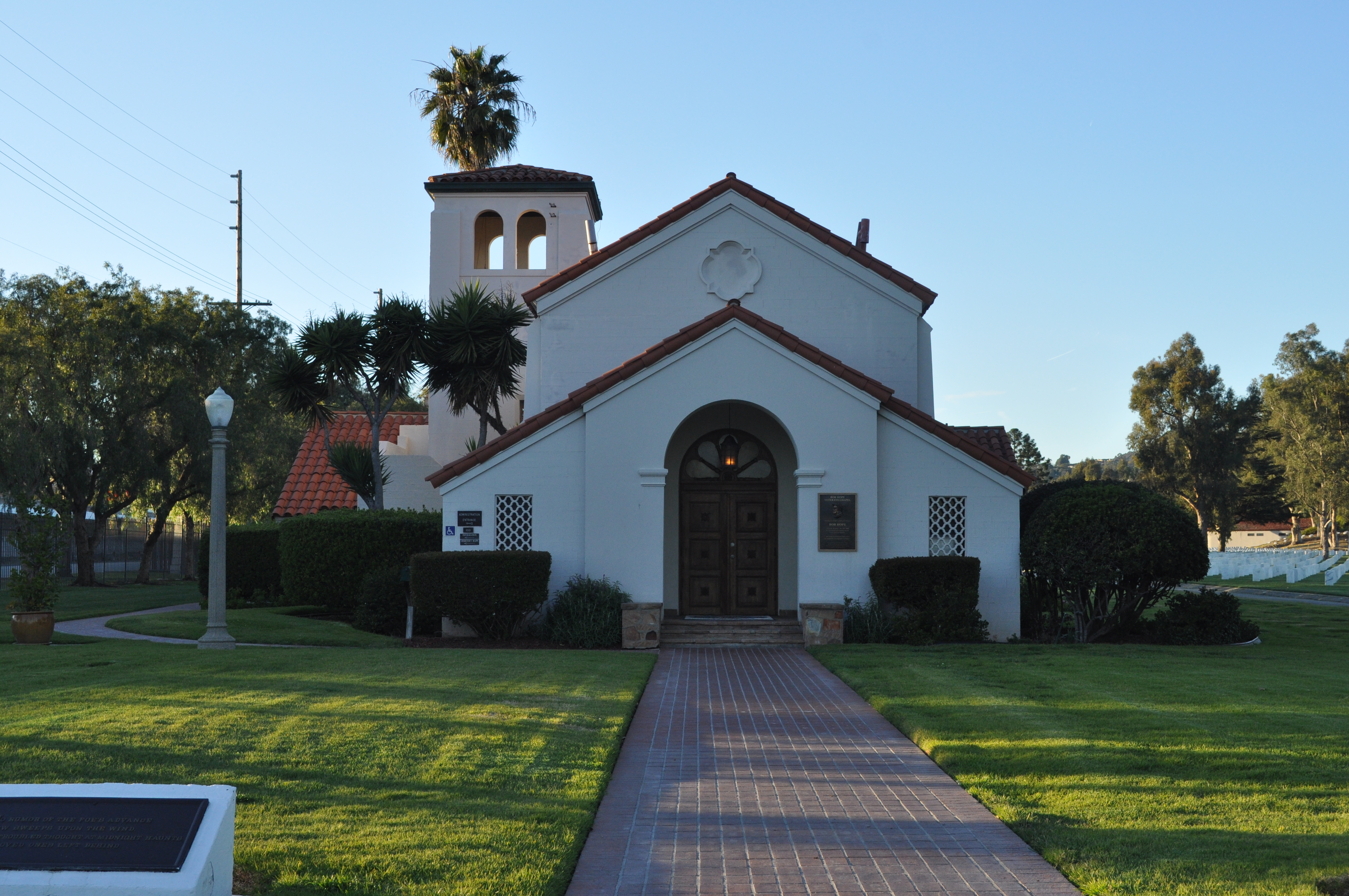
Bob Hope Veterans Chapel, with a plaque honoring Hope shown on the wall by the chapel's entrance

The Los Angeles National Cemetery is a United States National Cemetery in the Sawtelle unincorporated community of the West Los Angeles neighborhood in Los Angeles County, California.

== Geography ==
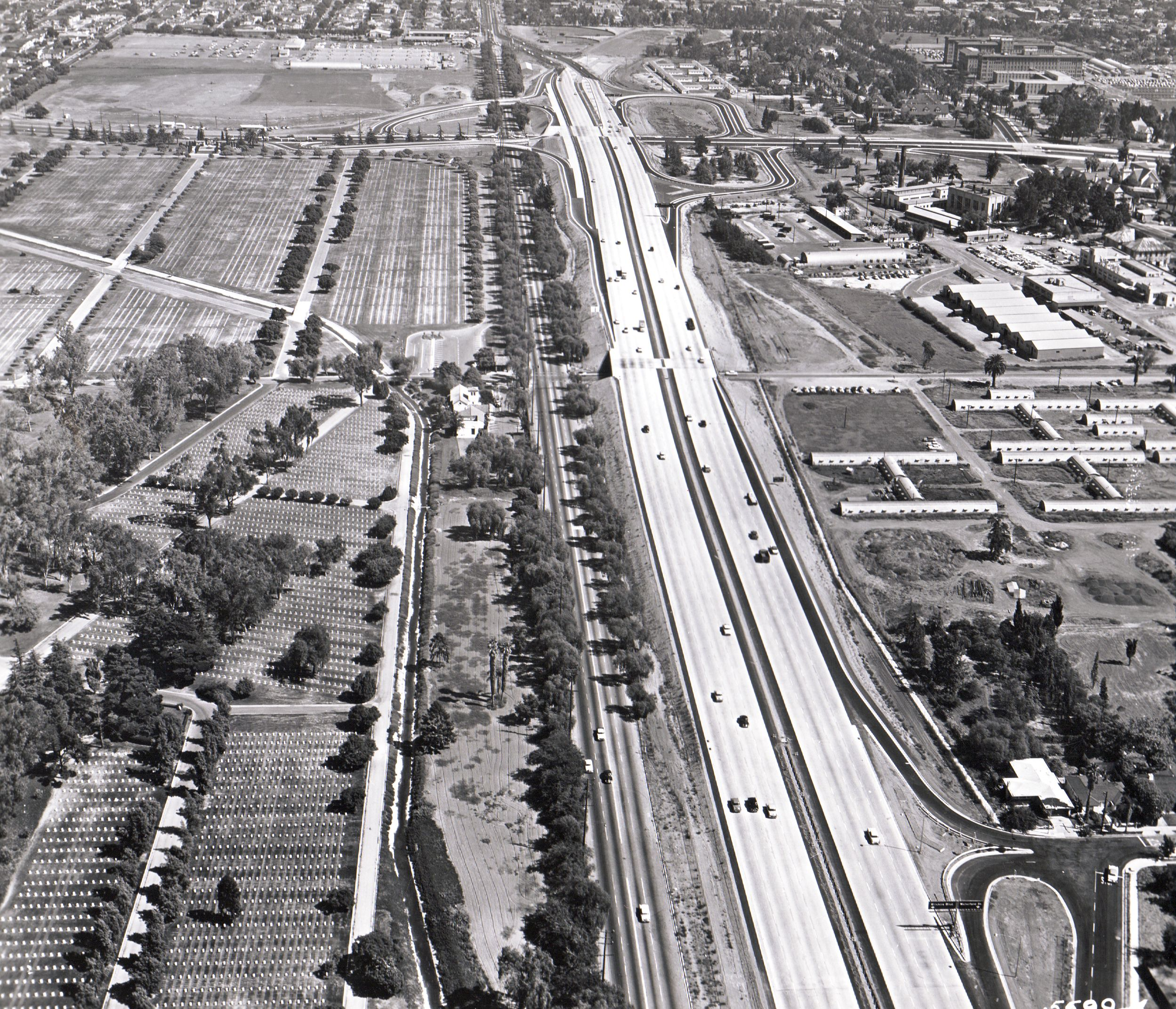
Interstate 405 next to the cemetery, 1957

The entrance to the cemetery is located at 950 South Sepulveda Boulevard (90049) at Constitution Avenue, near the intersection of Sepulveda Boulevard and Wilshire Boulevard. It is adjacent to Westwood, Los Angeles and UCLA along the east across Veteran Avenue, and the main Sawtelle Veterans Home campus across the San Diego Freeway (405) along the west. The cemetery was dedicated on May 22, 1889. It is directly connected to the central Veterans Home facilities by Constitution Avenue's underpass below freeway.

== Cemetery ==
Interred on its 114 acres (46 ha) are war veterans, from the:

- Mexican–American War
- Civil War
- Spanish–American War
- World War I
- World War II
- Korean War
- Vietnam War
- Iraq War
- War in Afghanistan

An annual ceremony commemorating the birthday of Abraham Lincoln is held at the cemetery on or near February 12. The cemetery's annual Memorial Day program draws several thousand attendees each year.

The chapel at the cemetery was renamed the Bob Hope Veterans Chapel on 29 May 2002, Bob Hope's 99th birthday, in "celebration of his lifelong service to our American Veterans."

=== Notable burials ===
==== Medal of Honor recipients ====
Fourteen Medal of Honor recipients are buried at the cemetery:

- Sergeant First Class (then Sergeant) Chris Carr (medal awarded under name of Christos H. Karaberis), (World War II), US Army, Company L, 337th Infantry, 85th Infantry Division. Guignola, Italy, October 1–2, 1944
- Sergeant George H. Eldridge, (Indian Campaigns) US Army, Company C, 6th US Cavalry. Wichita River, Texas, July 12, 1870
- Sergeant Harry Harvey (also known as Harry Huckman), (Spanish American War) US Marine Corps, April 5, 1929
- Sergeant (then Corporal) Luther Kaltenbach, (Civil War) US Army, Company F, 12 Iowa Infantry. Nashville, Tennessee, December 16, 1864
- Landsman William F. Lukes (Korean Campaign of 1871) US Navy, Company D. Korean Forts, June 9–10, 1871
- Color Sergeant George McKee, (Civil War), US Army, Company D, 89th New York Infantry. Petersburg, Virginia, April 2, 1865
- Sergeant (then Private) Edward Murphy, (Indian Campaigns) US Army, Company G, 1st US Cavalry. Chiricahua Mountains, Arizona Territory, October 20, 1869
- Corporal Edwin Phoenix, (Indian Campaigns) US Army, Company E, 4th US Cavalry. Red River Texas, September 26–28, 1875
- Farrier Samuel Porter, (Indian Campaigns) US Army, Company L, 6th US Cavalry. Wichita River, Texas, July 12, 1870
- Private Charles W. Rundle, (Civil War) US Army, Company A, 116th Illinois Infantry. Vicksburg, Mississippi, May 22, 1863
- Wagoner Griffin Seward, (Indian Campaigns) US Army, Company G, 8th US Cavalry. Chiricahua Mountains, Arizona Territory, October 20, 1869
- Coxswain Timothy Sullivan, (Civil War) US Navy, USS Louisville. Battles in Arkansas, Tennessee and Mississippi, unknown date of action
- Corporal (then Private) James Sweeney, (Civil War) US Army, Company A, 1st Vermont Cavalry. Cedar Creek, Virginia, October 19, 1864
- Private Robert H. Von Schlick (China Relief Expedition, Boxer Rebellion) US Army, Infantry, Company C, 9th US Infantry. Tientsin, China, July 13, 1900

==== Other veterans ====
A bronze soldier standing at parade rest is perched atop a boulder to honor Civil War soldiers, erected in 1942.

- More than one hundred Buffalo Soldiers are interred at the Los Angeles National Cemetery. These African American soldiers were members of the 9th, 10th, 24th, and 25th Cavalry during the American Civil War
- A. A. Burleigh (c. 1845–1938) American A.M.E. minister, sergeant in the Union Army during the American Civil War
- Scotty Bowers (1923–2019) sex worker, author, private first class
- Paul Brinegar (1917–1995) actor, World War II US Navy chief radioman
- Jack Burns (1933–2020) comedian, actor, sergeant
- Richard Carlson (1912–1977) actor, married to Mona
- Royal Dano (1922–1994) actor, US Army sergeant
- Kevin Dobson (1943–2020) actor, specialist 4th class
- Jack Dougherty (1895–1938) actor, married to Barbara La Marr
- Nicholas Porter Earp (1813–1907) lawmen, father of Wyatt Earp
- Larry Gelman (1930–2021) actor, sergeant
- Paul Genge (1913–1988) actor, staff sergeant
- Harold Gould (1923–2010) actor, private
- Russell Hicks (1895–1957) actor, US Army first lieutenant
- Lawson Harris (1897–1948) actor, director, producer, and writer; father of John Derek
- Richard H. Kline (1926–2018) cinematographer, US Navy
- Dean Paul Martin (1951–1987) US Air Force, captain, F-4 Phantom fighter pilot; son of Dean Martin, killed when his jet crashed during a storm
- Howard McNear (1905–1969) actor, played Floyd the Barber on the Andy Griffith Show; US Army private, World War II
- Don Newcombe (1926–2019) Major League Baseball player, US Army
- Woodrow Parfrey (1922–1984) film and television actor, US Army
- Donald Prell (1924–2020) venture capitalist, infantry officer in WWII (wounded and captured in the Battle of the Bulge).
- Charlie Robinson (1945–2021) actor, private first class
- Henry Rowland (1913–1984) actor, US Army corporal
- John Russell (1921–1991) actor, US Marine Corps 2nd lieutenant, World War II, veteran of Guadalcanal campaign
- Paul C. Vogel (1899–1975) cinematographer; US Army captain in WWI and WWII; Oscar-winner for cinematography for "Battleground" 1949
- Harlan Warde (1917–1980) character actor in television and movies, US Army
- James R. Webb (1909–1974) screenwriter, US Army
- Grant Williams (1931–1985) actor who played The Incredible Shrinking Man, US Air Force
- The cemetery contains two British Commonwealth war graves from World War II, a Leading Aircraftman of the Royal Australian Air Force and a Captain of the Royal Canadian Artillery
- Two service dogs were buried in the mid 1940s, however, this practice is no longer permitted. Bonus was a service dog at the Sawtelle Soldiers Home and Blackout was a sentry dog that sustained wounds in the Pacific

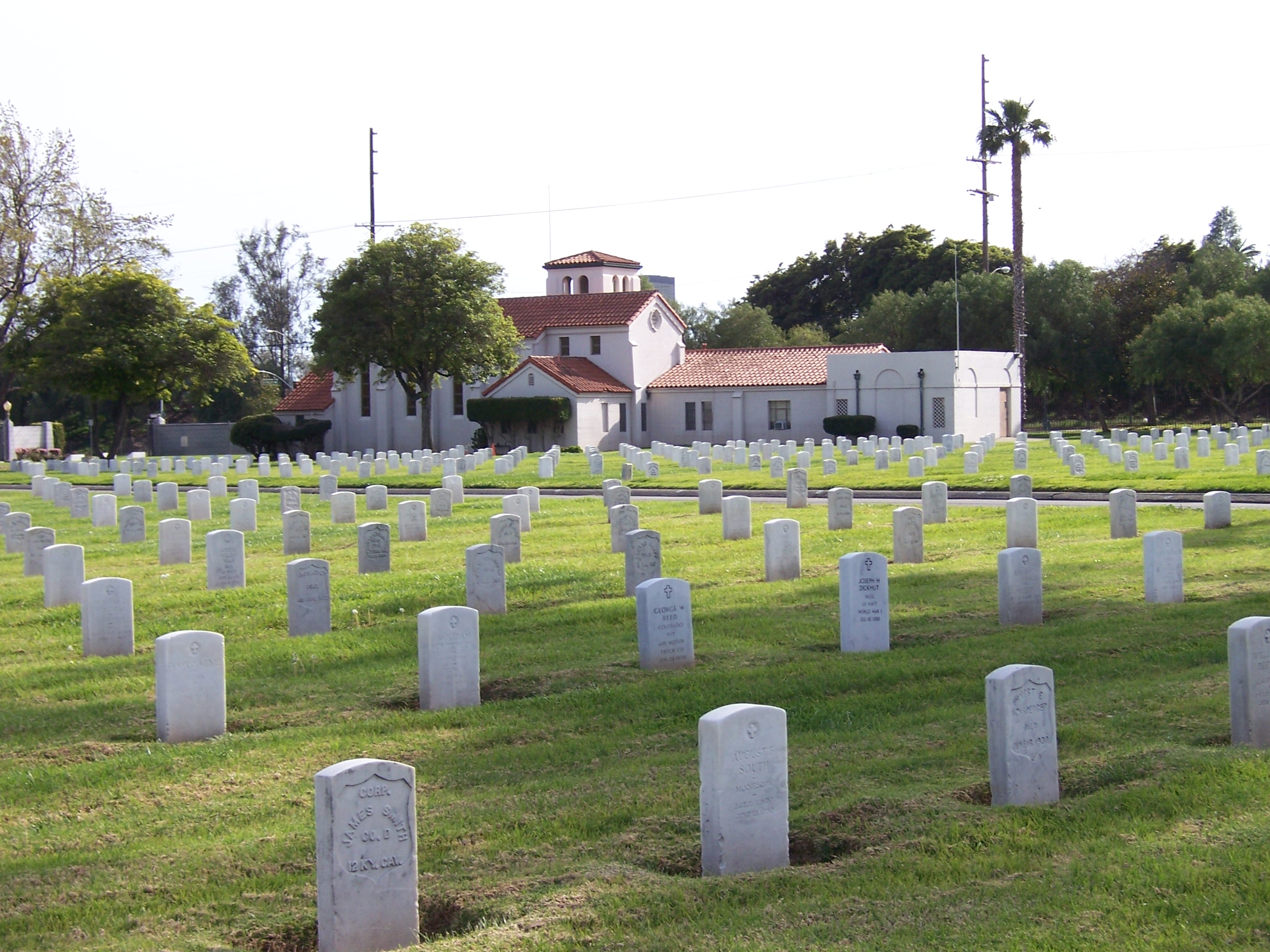
View towards southwest and the Bob Hope Veterans Chapel

=== Future burials ===
Los Angeles National Cemetery has been closed to new interments since approximately 1978, with the exception of spouses of those already buried. To accommodate community need, the Department of Veterans Affairs acquired another 13 acres (5.3 ha) to permit the cemetery to expand. Future interments will be in urns of cremated ashes placed in columbarium walls built on the new land. By eliminating ground burials, the new acreage will permit about as many new interments as are in the existing 114 acres (46 ha).

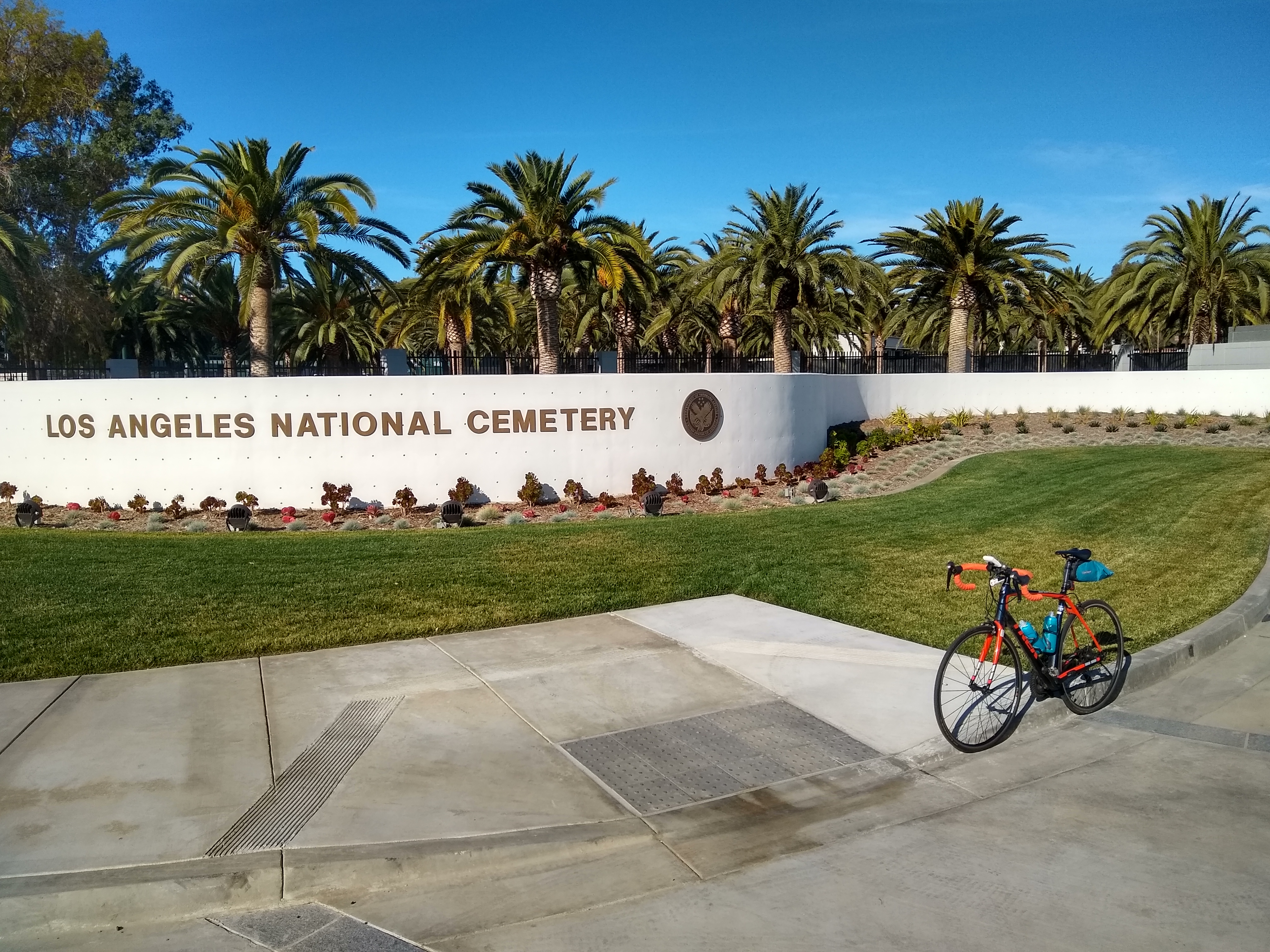
The entrance sign to the new columbarium section opened October 2019

In 2017, Los Angeles National Cemetery began construction on the first phase of the columbarium on Constitution Avenue, west of I-405 just 100 yards (91 m) from the main cemetery entrance. This phase opened in October 2019 and occupies approximately 4.4 acres (1.8 ha) of the site and holds 10,000 niches for cremated remains. The cemetery will construct additional niches on the site as needed until it reaches the planned capacity of 90,854.
