= Ulric L. Crocker =

- Born: September 5, 1843; Ohio
- Died: February 2, 1913 (aged 69); Illinois
- Burial place: Medora Cemetery, Medora, Illinois
- Military career
- Allegiance: United States
- Branch: United States Army; Union Army
- Rank: Private
- Unit: 6th Michigan Volunteer Cavalry Regiment
- Conflicts: American Civil War • Battle of Cedar Creek
- Awards: Medal of Honor

Ulric Lyona Crocker (September 5, 1843 – February 2, 1913) was a Union Army soldier during the American Civil War. He received the Medal of Honor for gallantry during the Battle of Cedar Creek fought near Middletown, Virginia on October 19, 1864. The battle was the decisive engagement of Major General Philip Sheridan's Valley Campaigns of 1864 and was the largest battle fought in the Shenandoah Valley.

== Medal of Honor citation ==
"The President of the United States of America, in the name of Congress, takes pleasure in presenting the Medal of Honor to Private Ulric Lyona Crocker, United States Army, for extraordinary heroism on 19 October 1864, while serving with Company M, 6th Michigan Cavalry, in action at Cedar Creek, Virginia, for capture of flag of 18th Georgia (Confederate States of America)."

== See also ==
- List of Medal of Honor recipients for the Battle of Cedar Creek
- List of American Civil War Medal of Honor recipients: A-F
