= James Clay Rice =

Union Army officer in the American Civil War

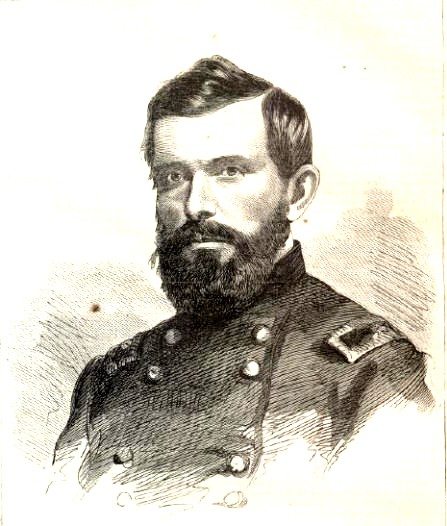
- James C. Rice in Harper's Weekly, 28 May 1864
- Born: December 27, 1828; Worthington, Massachusetts
- Died: May 10, 1864 (aged 35); Spotsylvania Courthouse, Virginia
- Burial place: Albany Rural Cemetery, Menands, New York
- Military career
- Allegiance: United States of America; Union
- Branch: United States Army; Union Army
- Service years: 1861–1864
- Rank: Brigadier General of Volunteers
- Nickname: "Old Crazy"
- Commands: 44th New York Volunteer Infantry Regiment
- Conflicts: American Civil War; First Battle of Bull Run; Peninsula Campaign; Second Battle of Bull Run; Battle of Fredericksburg; Battle of Chancellorsville; Battle of Gettysburg; Battle of the Wilderness; Battle of Spotsylvania Court House †
- Other work: teacher, journalist, lawyer

James Clay Rice (December 27, 1828 – May 10, 1864) was a lawyer from Massachusetts who became a brigadier general of volunteers in the Union Army during the American Civil War. He was killed at the Battle of Spotsylvania Court House in May 1864.

== Early life ==
Rice was born in Worthington, Massachusetts, on December 27, 1828, to William Rice and Welthea (Cottrell) Rice. He was self-educated for most of his early life and eventually graduated from Yale University. He subsequently became a teacher in Natchez, Mississippi, and worked for a newspaper. During this time he began studying law and was admitted to the bar in New York City, where he began his practice.

== Civil War ==
Signature of Brig. Gen. James Clay Rice on an 1864 letter to New York Governor Horatio Seymour

When the Civil War broke out, Rice enlisted on 28 May 1861 in the 39th New York Infantry Regiment, quickly becoming a captain of Company B and engaging at the First Battle of Bull Run. Rice was mustered out of the 39th New York Volunteer Infantry Regiment on 12 Sep 1861. The next day Rice became lieutenant colonel of the newly formed 44th New York Volunteer Infantry Regiment (also known as People's Ellsworth Regiment). He fought in the Peninsula Campaign and on July 4, 1862, became colonel of the regiment. At the Second Battle of Bull Run, Colonel Rice temporarily took command of the 3rd Brigade, 1st Division, V Corps when its commander, Daniel Butterfield, took command of the consolidated 1st and 2nd Brigades and other ranking officers were wounded on the second day of battle. Rice returned to command of the 44th New York and led it at the battles of Fredericksburg and Chancellorsville. At the Battle of Gettysburg, Rice and his regiment were sent to the defense of Little Round Top. During the fighting, brigade commander Colonel Strong Vincent was mortally wounded and Rice once again assumed command of the 3rd Brigade, 1st Division, V Corps and led it for the remainder of the battle. For his service at Gettysburg, Rice was promoted to brigadier general of volunteers on August 17, 1863. In March 1864, General Rice was in command of the 2nd Brigade, 4th Division, V Corps which he led into action at the Battle of the Wilderness. Rice was mortally wounded two months later at the Battle of Spotsylvania Court House. As he lay dying he muttered the words "turn me over that I may die with my face to the enemy." He died on the Spotsylvania battlefield on May 10, 1864. He was buried at Albany Rural Cemetery, Menands, New York, in section 42, plot 11.

== Genealogy ==
James Clay Rice was a direct descendant of Edmund Rice, an English immigrant to the Massachusetts Bay Colony, as follows:

- James Clay Rice, son of

- William Rice (1778 – ?), son of
- Joseph Rice (1745–1826), son of
- Ebenezer Rice (1709–1793), son of

- Ebenezer Rice (1671–1724), son of
- Benjamin Rice (1640–1713), son of

- Edmund Rice (1594–1663)

== Legacy ==
An impressive monument to the 12th New York and Rice's own 44th New York Volunteer Infantry Regiment was constructed on the Gettysburg battlefield.

In the 1993 film Gettysburg, Colonel Rice was portrayed by Joshua D. Maurer and is briefly seen congratulating Col. Joshua L. Chamberlain following the fighting on Little Round Top, informing him of the name of that place.

== See also ==
- List of American Civil War generals (Union)
- Little Round Top
