= Nicholas Geschwind =

Recipient of the Medal of Honor (1829–1897)

- Civil War era Army Medal of Honor
- Born: c. 1829; Alsace-Lorraine, France
- Died: January 2, 1897; Quincy, Illinois
- Burial place: Springdale Cemetery, Peoria, Illinois
- Military career
- Allegiance: United States
- Branch: United States Army; Union Army
- Service years: 1862 - 1865
- Rank: Captain
- Unit: 116th Illinois Volunteer Infantry Regiment
- Conflicts: American Civil War • Siege of Vicksburg
- Awards: Medal of Honor

Nicholas Geschwind (c. 1829 – January 2, 1897) was a Union Army officer during the American Civil War. He received the Medal of Honor for gallantry during the siege of Vicksburg on May 22, 1863.

Geschwind joined the 116th Illinois Infantry in October 1862 (at age 33), and mustered out with his regiment in June 1865.

== Union assault ==
On May 22, 1863, General Ulysses S. Grant ordered an assault on the Confederate heights at Vicksburg, Mississippi. The plan called for a storming party of volunteers to build a bridge across a moat and plant scaling ladders against the enemy embankment in advance of the main attack. The volunteers knew the odds were against survival and the mission was called, in nineteenth century vernacular, a "forlorn hope". Only single men were accepted as volunteers and even then, twice as many men as needed came forward and were turned away. The assault began in the early morning following a naval bombardment. The Union soldiers came under enemy fire immediately and were pinned down in the ditch they were to cross. Despite repeated attacks by the main Union body, the men of the forlorn hope were unable to retreat until nightfall. Of the 150 men in the storming party, nearly half were killed. Seventy-nine of the survivors were awarded the Medal of Honor.

== Medal of Honor citation ==
"For gallantry in the charge of the volunteer storming party on 22 May 1863."

== See also ==
- List of Medal of Honor recipients
- List of American Civil War Medal of Honor recipients: G-L
