= George H. Eldridge =

American soldier in the U.S. Army

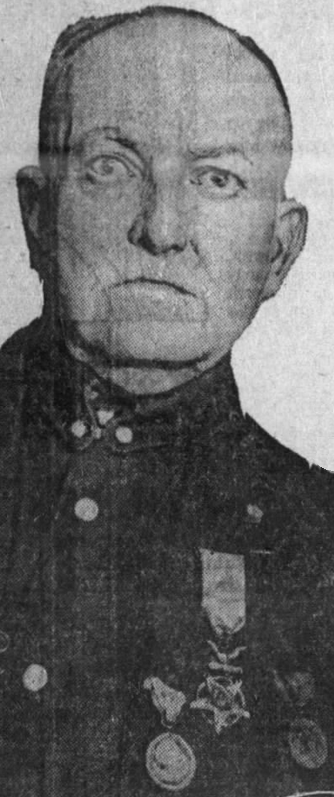
- Born: May 12, 1844; Sackets Harbor, New York, United States
- Died: November 20, 1918 (aged 74); Los Angeles, California
- Burial place: Los Angeles National Cemetery
- Military career
- Allegiance: United States of America; Union
- Branch: United States Army; Union Army
- Service years: c. 1861–1871
- Rank: Sergeant
- Units: 6th U.S. Cavalry; 24th Michigan Volunteer Infantry
- Conflicts: American Civil War; Indian Wars; Texas–Indian Wars
- Awards: Medal of Honor

George H. Eldridge (May 12, 1844 – November 20, 1918) was an American soldier in the U.S. Army who served with the 24th Michigan Volunteer Infantry in the American Civil War and the 6th U.S. Cavalry during the Texas–Indian Wars. He received the Medal of Honor for gallantry fighting the Kiowa Indians and Chief Kicking Bird at the Battle of the Little Wichita River on July 12, 1870.

== Biography ==
George H. Eldridge was born in Sackets Harbor, New York on May 12, 1844. He later moved to Michigan where, at the start of the American Civil War, he joined the 24th Michigan Volunteer Infantry which along with the 2nd, 6th and 7th Wisconsin Volunteer Infantry regiments, would form the "Iron Brigade" of the Army of the Potomac. Eldridge returned to military service years later when he enlisted in the U.S. Army in Detroit and was assigned to the 6th U.S. Cavalry. He took part in campaigns against the Plains Indians during the Texas-Indian Wars, most notably, against the Kiowa in the late-1860s. On July 6, 1870, he was among the cavalrymen under Captain Curwen B. McClelland who left Fort Richardson (near Jacksboro, Texas) to pursue renegade Indians who had seized mail from nearby Rock Station. After a 5-day chase, McClelland's force was ambushed at Wichita River by a force of 250 warriors under Chief Kicking Bird resulting in the Battle of the Little Wichita River. Despite being outnumbered and outgunned, the cavalry troopers managed to force the Kiowas to retreat after heavy fighting. After returning to Fort Richardson, Eldridge and 12 other soldiers received the Medal of Honor for "gallantry in action" on August 25, 1870. He died in Los Angeles, California on November 20, 1918, and was interred at the Los Angeles National Cemetery.

== Medal of Honor citation ==
Rank and organization: Sergeant, Company C, 6th U.S. Cavalry. Place and date: At Wichita River, Tex., July 12, 1870. Entered service at: ------. Birth: Sacketts Harbor, N.Y. Date of issue: August 25, 1870.

Citation:

Gallantry in action.

== See also ==
- List of Medal of Honor recipients for the Indian Wars
