= Griffin Seward =

United States Army Medal of Honor recipient

- Born: August 10, 1842; Hazlettsville, Delaware
- Died: September 10, 1908 (aged 63); National Home for Disabled Volunteer Soldiers Los Angeles, California
- Burial place: Los Angeles National Cemetery Los Angeles, California
- Military career
- Allegiance: United States of America; Union
- Branch: United States Army; Union Army
- Service years: 1861–1865, 1866–1871
- Unit: Company G of 8th United States Cavalry
- Conflicts: American Civil War; Battle at Chiricahua Mountains
- Awards: Medal of Honor

Griffin Seward (August 10, 1842 – September 10, 1908) was an American Civil War Medal of Honor recipient who served in the United States Army as a wagoner in Company G of 8th United States Regular Cavalry.

== Biography ==
Born in Hazlettsville, six miles west of Dover, Delaware, Seward enlisted on August 16, 1861, in Company B, 2nd Pennsylvania Cavalry. He was noted as a farmer, 5' 3" tall, weighed 113 lbs., with gray eyes, black hair, and a dark complexion. During the Civil War, Seward was taken as a prisoner in April, 1863, later he either was released or escaped and then was taken as a prisoner a second time when he was sent to Andersonville, Georgia.

Seward was discharged on July 13, 1865, when he returned to Delaware to work on a farm in Delaware City. He re-enlisted in November 1866 and was sent to the Arizona Territory, where he fought Cochise and the Chiricahua Apaches during a battle at Chiricahua Mountains on October 20, 1869, earning the Medal of Honor for Gallantry in Action.

Captain Bernard noted in his report:

These men are they who advanced with me up the steep and rocky mesa under as heavy a fire as I ever saw delivered from the number of men, Indians, say from one hundred to two hundred. These men advanced under this fire until within thirty steps from the Indians when they came to a ledge of rocks where every man who showed his head was shot at by several Indians at once. Here the men remained and did good shooting through the crevices of the rocks until ordered to fall back which was done by running from rock to rock where they would halt and return the fire of the Indians.

After his discharge at Fort Selden in November 1871, Seward remained in the area and became an Indian trader at a post near Holbrook, Arizona Territory. He died at the National Home for Disabled Volunteer Soldiers in Los Angeles, California (Santa Monica, California) on September 10, 1908, and was buried at Los Angeles National Cemetery.

== Medal of Honor citation ==

Rank and organization: Wagoner, Company G, 8th U.S. Cavalry. Place and date: At Chiricahua Mountains, Ariz., October 20, 1869. Birth: Dover, Del. Date of issue: February 14, 1870.

Citation: Gallantry in action.

== See also ==
- List of Medal of Honor recipients
