= John M. Wiley =

American politician

John McClure Wiley
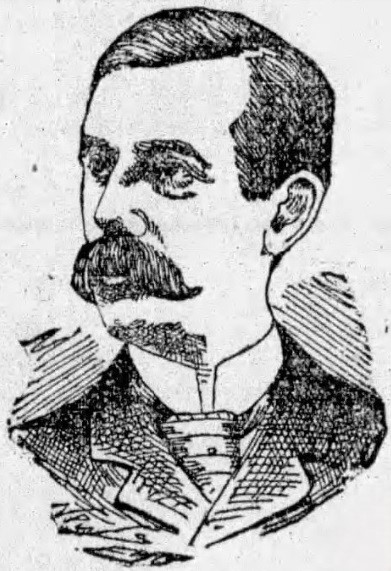
- Buffalo News, April 16, 1890

Member of the New York State Assembly for Erie County, 5th District
- In office January 1, 1871 – December 31, 1872
- Preceded by: Lyman Oatman
- Succeeded by: Robert B. Foote

Member of the U.S. House of Representatives from New York's 33rd district
- In office March 4, 1889 – March 3, 1891
- Preceded by: John B. Weber
- Succeeded by: Thomas L. Bunting

Personal details
- Born: August 11, 1841 Derry, Ireland, U.K.
- Died: August 13, 1912 (aged 71) St. Catharines, Ontario, Canada
- Resting place: Crown Hill Cemetery and Arboretum, Section 29, Lot 6, Indianapolis, Indiana, U.S.
- Party: Democratic
- Children: John Cooper Wiley

John McClure Wiley (August 11, 1841 – August 13, 1912) was a U.S. representative from New York.

== Biography ==
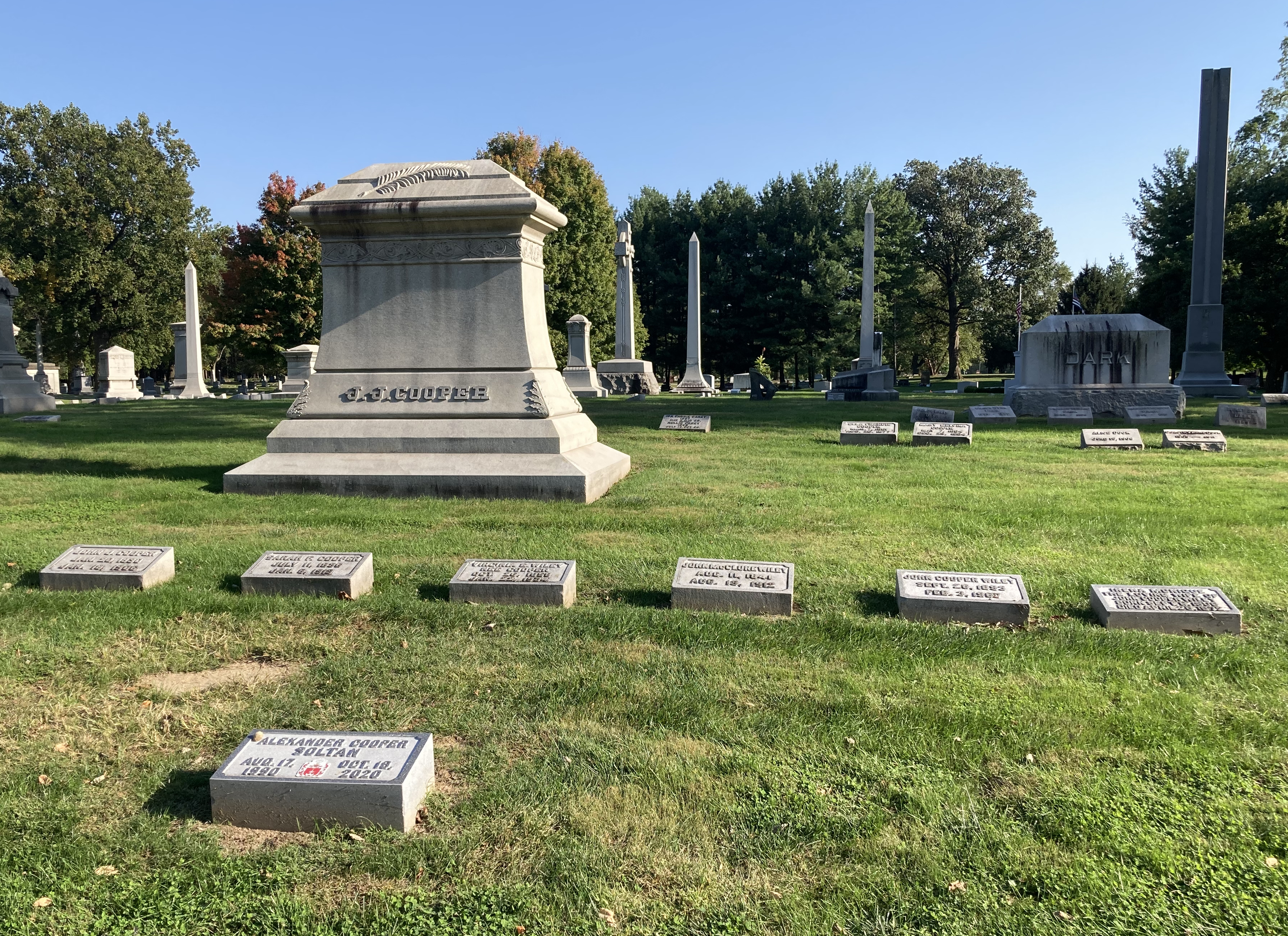
Wiley's grave (third from right) at Crown Hill Cemetery

Born in Derry, Ireland, Wiley immigrated to the United States in 1850 with his parents, who settled in Erie County, New York. He attended the common schools, engaged in mercantile pursuits, and became active in the real estate business in Colden, New York.

A Democrat, He was a member of the New York State Assembly (Erie Co., 5th D.) in 1871 and 1872. He served as delegate to the Democratic National Conventions in 1884, 1888, and 1892.

Wiley was elected as a Democrat to the Fifty-first Congress (March 4, 1889 – March 3, 1891). He declined to be a candidate for renomination in 1890. In 1890 he married Virginia Emmeline Cooper (1858–1934), the daughter of John J. Cooper, who was Indiana State Treasurer from 1883 to 1887. Their son, John Cooper Wiley, was a career diplomat who served as U.S. ambassador to several foreign countries.

On April 24, 1893, President Grover Cleveland appointed Wiley to be U.S. Consul at Bordeaux, France, and he served until July 31, 1897.

After returning to the United States, Wiley resided in Jacksonville, Florida during the winter and Colden, New York during the summer. In his later years his summer residence was in Washington, D.C.

Wiley died in St. Catharines, Ontario, Canada, August 13, 1912. He was interred at Crown Hill Cemetery in Indianapolis, Indiana.

== Sources ==
=== Newspapers ===
- "A Congressman's Wedding". San Francisco Call. San Francisco, CA. April 16, 1890 – via California Digital Newspaper Collection.
- "Wiley Draws a Prize". Buffalo Courier. Washington (published April 26, 1893). April 25, 1893 – via Newspapers.com.
- "Judge Tourgee Honored". The Buffalo Enquirer. May 12, 1897 – via Newspapers.com.
- "Hon. Albion W. Tourgee". National Tribune. Washington, D.C. July 8, 1897 – via Newspapers.com.
- "Death Notice, John McClure Wiley" (PDF). The New York Times. Buffalo, New York (published August 14, 1912). August 13, 1912.
- "John M'Clure Wiley Dead". Indianapolis News. August 14, 1912 – via Newspapers.com.
- "Dies at Washington: Mrs. Virginia Cooper Wiley; Was Member of Early Day Kokomo Family". Kokomo Tribune. Indianapolis. Associated Press. January 23, 1934 – via Newspapers.com.

=== Books ===
- Blume, Kenneth J. (2017). Historical Dictionary of U.S. Diplomacy from the Civil War to World War I. Lanham, MD: Rowman & Littlefield. ISBN 978-1-4422-7333-7.
- United States Congress (1903). A Biographical Congressional Directory, 1777 to 1903. Washington, DC: US Government Printing Office.

New York State Assembly
Preceded by Lyman Oatman	New York State Assembly; Erie County, 5th District; 1871–1872	Succeeded by Robert B. Foote
U.S. House of Representatives
Preceded by John B. Weber	Member of the U.S. House of Representatives from New York's 33rd congressional district 1889–1891	Succeeded by Thomas L. Bunting
