= John W. Blunt =

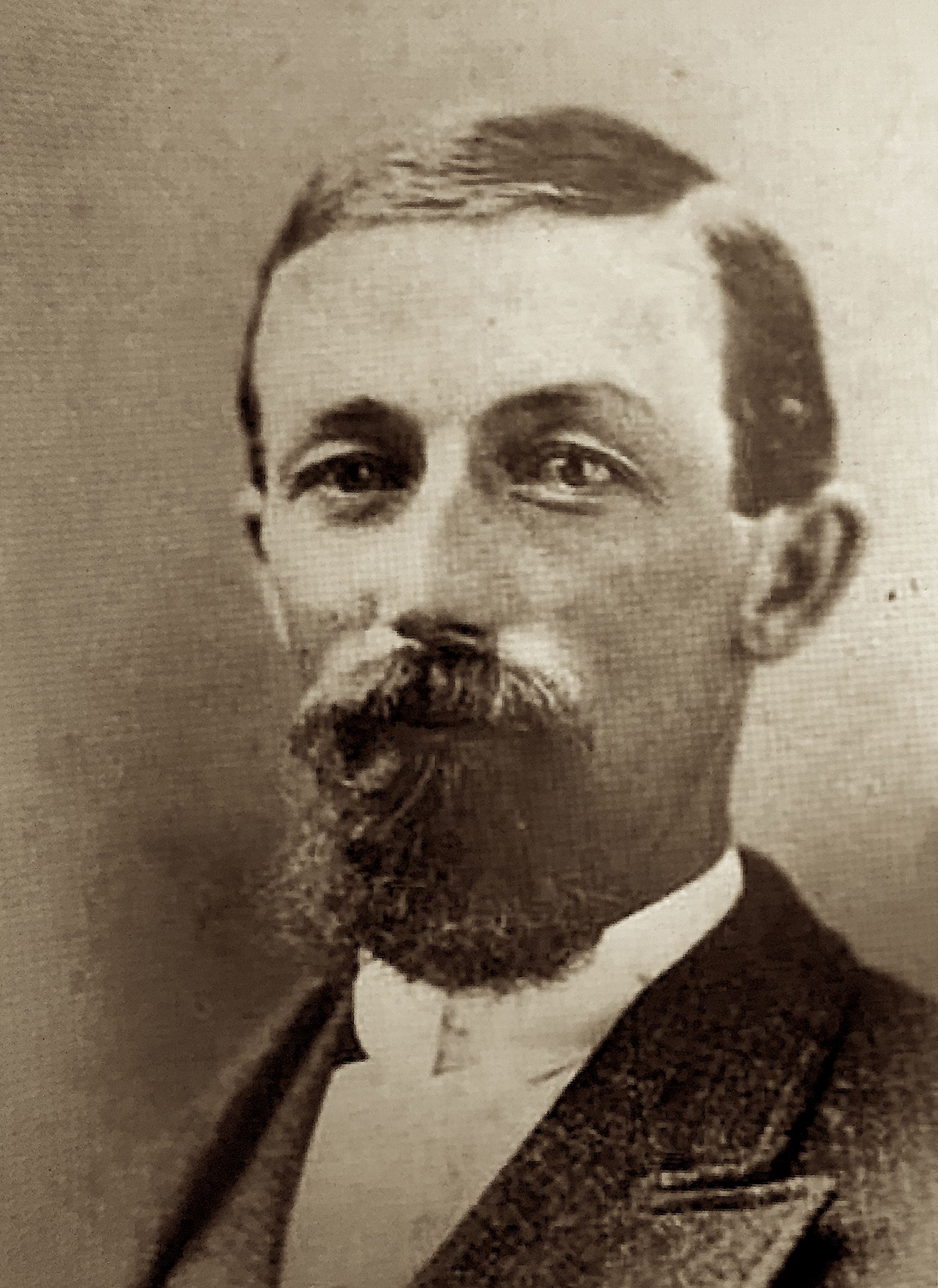
- Born: May 18, 1840; Columbia County, New York
- Died: January 21, 1910 (aged 69); New York
- Burial place: Chatham Rural Cemetery, Chatham, New York
- Military career
- Allegiance: United States
- Branch: United States Army; Union Army
- Service years: 1861–1865
- Rank: Captain; Brevet Major
- Unit: (New York (state)) 6th Regiment New York Volunteer Cavalry
- Conflicts: American Civil War • Battle of Cedar Creek
- Awards: Medal of Honor

John W. Blunt (May 18, 1840 – January 21, 1910) was a Union Army officer during the American Civil War. He received the Medal of Honor for gallantry during the Battle of Cedar Creek fought near Middletown, Virginia on October 19, 1864. The battle was the decisive engagement of Major General Philip Sheridan's Valley Campaigns of 1864 and was the largest battle fought in the Shenandoah Valley.

Blunt enlisted in the Army from Chatham, New York in October 1861, and was assigned to the 6th New York Cavalry. He was commissioned as an officer in November 1862. He transferred to the 2nd New York Provisional Cavalry in June 1865, and mustered out with this regiment in August.

== Medal of Honor citation ==
The President of the United States of America, in the name of Congress, takes pleasure in presenting the Medal of Honor to First Lieutenant John W. Blunt, United States Army, for extraordinary heroism on 19 October 1864, while serving with Company K, 6th New York Cavalry, in action at Cedar Creek, Virginia. First Lieutenant Blunt voluntarily led a charge across a narrow bridge over the creek, against the lines of the enemy.

== See also ==
- List of American Civil War Medal of Honor recipients: A-F
- List of Medal of Honor recipients for the Battle of Cedar Creek
