= Benjamin W. Schenck =

US Civil War Medal of Honor recipient (1837–1916)

- Born: August 12, 1837; Butler County, Ohio
- Died: February 19, 1916 (aged 78)
- Burial place: Decatur, Illinois
- Military career
- Allegiance: United States
- Branch: United States Army
- Rank: Private
- Units: Company D, 116th Illinois Volunteer Infantry Regiment
- Conflicts: American Civil War
- Awards: Medal of Honor

Benjamin W. Schenck (August 12, 1837 – February 19, 1916) was a Union Army soldier in the American Civil War who received the U.S. military's highest decoration, the Medal of Honor.

Schenck was born in Butler County, Ohio on August 12, 1837, and entered service at Maroa, Illinois. He was awarded the Medal of Honor, for extraordinary heroism on May 22, 1863, while serving as a Private with Company D, 116th Illinois Volunteer Infantry Regiment, at Vicksburg, Mississippi. His Medal of Honor was issued on August 14, 1894.

He died at the age of 78, on February 19, 1916, and was buried at the Greenwood Cemetery in Decatur, Illinois.

== Medal of Honor citation ==
The President of the United States of America, in the name of Congress, takes pleasure in presenting the Medal of Honor to Private Benjamin W. Schenck, United States Army, for gallantry in the charge of the volunteer storming party on 22 May 1863, while serving with Company D, 116th Illinois Infantry, in action at Vicksburg, Mississippi.
