= Luther Kaltenbach =

- Born: August 16, 1843; Grand Duchy of Baden
- Died: September 1, 1922 (aged 79); Los Angeles, California
- Burial place: Los Angeles National Cemetery
- Spouse: May A. Wardlow (m. 1907)
- Military career
- Allegiance: United States
- Branch: United States Army
- Service years: 1861–1866
- Rank: Sergeant
- Unit: 12th Iowa Infantry Regiment
- Conflicts: American Civil War: Battle of Shiloh; Battle of Nashville
- Awards: Medal of Honor

Luther Kaltenbach was a veteran of the American Civil War and a recipient of the Medal of Honor.

== Biography ==
Kaltenbach was born in the Grand Duchy of Baden but immigrated to the United States at the age of one or two. Most of his childhood was taken up by helping work on his family's farm. He joined the 12th Iowa Infantry near the start of the Civil War in 1861.

On April 6, 1862, during the Battle of Shiloh, Kaltenbach was shot in the right hand. The injury left him with two crooked fingers that would continue to pain him throughout his life. Kaltenbach was captured by Confederate forces the same day he was injured. However, he returned to active service with his unit after being paroled by his Confederate captors.

== Battle of Nashville ==
During the Battle of Nashville Kaltenbach and the 12th Iowa Infantry attacked entrenched Confederate positions. On December 16, 1864, Kaltenbach participated in a final charge against several Confederate regiments. During the attack, the color bearer of the 44th Mississippi Infantry was incapacitated. Kaltenbach advanced ahead of his unit over Confederate barricades and captured the regiment's flag.

Two days after the battle, a special field order was given to allow Kaltenbach and sixteen other soldiers who had captured enemy flags during the Battle of Nashville and the Battle of Franklin to journey to Washington, D.C. While there, they presented flags they had captured from Confederate forces to Secretary of War Edwin M. Stanton. All of the soldiers were granted furlough for a month, pay, and the Medal of Honor for their actions.

== Official citation ==
Capture of flag, of 44th Mississippi Infantry (C.S.A.).

== Later life ==
In 1868, Kaltenbach attempted to find a warmer climate to lessen the pain caused by the hand wound he received during the Battle of Shiloh. He moved to Colorado, then Utah, then California and lastly into Mexico. He moved to the state of Washington in 1878 following a stroke so he could be cared for by his brother. Several years later, he moved to Arizona where he worked as a Justice of the Peace. In 1892, Kaltenbach started to receive a disability pension of two dollars a month, and would later receive an extra ten dollars month for receiving the Medal of Honor. In 1903, he moved to California again. In 1905, Kaltenbach was granted a pension of twenty-four dollars a month by an Act of Congress. He married May Wardlow in 1907, but they divorced several years later. Kaltenbach died in 1922 after being hit by a car.
