= 116th Illinois Infantry Regiment =

116th Regiment Illinois Volunteer Infantry
- Active: September 30, 1862 – June 7, 1865
- Country: United States
- Allegiance: Union
- Branch: Infantry
- Engagements: Yazoo Pass Expedition; Battle of Chickasaw Bayou; Battle of Arkansas Post; Battle of Champion Hill; Siege of Vicksburg (May 19 and 22 assaults); Chattanooga campaign Battle of Missionary Ridge; Atlanta campaign Battle of Resaca; Battle of Dallas; Battle of New Hope Church; Battle of Allatoona; Battle of Kennesaw Mountain; Battle of Atlanta; Siege of Atlanta; Battle of Jonesboro; Battle of Lovejoy's Station; Sherman's March to the Sea; Carolinas campaign Battle of Bentonville

The 116th Illinois Volunteer Infantry was an infantry regiment in the Union Army during the American Civil War.

== Service ==
The 116th Illinois Infantry was organized in Decatur, Illinois, and mustered in for three years service on September 30, 1862, under the command of Colonel Nathan W. Tupper.

The regiment was attached to 4th Brigade, 5th Division, District of Memphis, XIII Corps, Department of the Tennessee, November 1862. 2nd Brigade, 2nd Division, District of Memphis, XIII Corps, to December 1862. 1st Brigade, 2nd Division, Sherman's Yazoo Pass Expedition, to January 1863. 1st Brigade, 2nd Division, XV Corps, Army of the Tennessee, to June 1865.

The 116th Illinois Infantry mustered out of service on June 7, 1865.

== Detailed service ==
At Memphis, Tennessee, until November 26, 1862. Grant's Central Mississippi Campaign. "Tallahatchie March" November 26-December 12. Sherman's Yazoo Expedition December 20, 1862, to January 2, 1863. Chickasaw Bayou December 26–28, 1862. Chickasaw Bluff December 29. Expedition to Arkansas Post, Arkansas, January 3–10, 1863. Assault on and capture of Fort Hindman, Arkansas Post, January 10–11. Moved to Young's Point, Louisiana, January 17–22, and duty there until March. Expedition to Rolling Fork, Mississippi, via Muddy, Steele's and Black Bayous, and Deer Creek, March 14–27. Demonstrations against Haines' and Drumgould's Bluffs April 29-May 2. Movement to Jackson, Mississippi, via Grand Gulf, May 2–14. Jackson May 14. Champion Hill May 16. Siege of Vicksburg May 18-July 4. Assaults on Vicksburg May 19 and 22. Surrender of Vicksburg July 4. Advance on Jackson, Mississippi, July 4–10. Siege of Jackson July 10–17. At Big Black until September 22. Moved to Memphis, Tennessee; then marched to Chattanooga September 26-November 20. Operations on Memphis & Charleston Railroad in Alabama October 20–29. Bear Creek, Tuscumbia, October 27. Chattanooga-Ringgold Campaign November 23–27. Foot of Missionary Ridge November 24. Tunnel Hill November 24–25. Missionary Ridge November 25. Pursuit to Graysville November 26–27. March to relief of Knoxville November 28-December 8. Moved to Larkinsville, Alabama, and duty there until May 1864. Expedition toward Rome, Georgia, January 25-February 5. Atlanta Campaign May 1-September 8. Demonstrations on Resaca May 8–13. Near Resaca May 13. Battle of Resaca May 14–15. Advance on Dallas May 18–25. Operations on line of Pumpkin Vine Creek and battles about Dallas, New Hope Church, and Allatoona Hills May 25-June 5. Operations about Marietta and against Kennesaw Mountain June 10-July 2. Assault on Kennesaw June 27. Nickajack Creek July 2–5. Chattahoochie River July 5–17. Battle of Atlanta July 22. Siege of Atlanta July 22-August 25. Ezra Chapel, Hood's second sortie, July 28. Flank movement on Jonesboro August 25–30. Battle of Jonesboro August 31-September 1. Lovejoy's Station September 2–6. Operations against Hood in northern Georgia and northern Alabama September 29-November 3. March to the Sea November 15-December 10. Clinton November 21–28. Ball's Ferry and Georgia Central Railroad Bridge, Oconee River, November 23–25. Statesboro December 4. Siege of Savannah December 10–21. Fort McAllister December 13. Campaign of the Carolinas January to April, 1865. Salkehatchie Swamps, S. C., February 2–5. South Edisto River February 9. North Edisto River February 12–13. Columbia February 16–17. Battle of Bentonville, North Carolina, March 20–21. Occupation of Goldsboro March 24. Advance on Raleigh April 10–14. Occupation of Raleigh April 14. Bennett's House April 26. Surrender of Johnston and his army. March to Washington, D.C., via Richmond, Virginia, April 29-May 19. Grand Review of the Armies May 24.

== Casualties ==
The regiment lost a total of 295 men during its service; 7 officers and 49 enlisted men killed or mortally wounded, 7 officers and 232 enlisted men died of disease.

== Commanders ==
- Colonel Nathan W. Tupper

== Notable members ==
- Private Charles Earl Bowles, Company B - post-Civil War western stagecoach robber known as "Black Bart"
- Sergeant Martin K. Davis, Company H - Medal of Honor—Participating in a diversionary "forlorn hope" attack on Confederate defenses, 22 May 1863.
- Captain Nicholas Geschwind, Company F - Medal of Honor — Participating in the same "forlorn hope."
- Private Andrew Johnson (soldier), Company G - Medal of Honor — Participating in the same "forlorn hope."
- Private Charles W. Rundle, Company A - Medal of Honor — Participating in the same "forlorn hope."
- Private Benjamin W. Schenck, Company D - Medal of Honor — Participating in the same "forlorn hope."
- Corporal Benona Sprague, Company F - Medal of Honor — Participating in the same "forlorn hope."
- Private Thomas J. Ward, Company C - Medal of Honor — Participating in the same "forlorn hope."
- Private Andrew J. Widick, Company B - Medal of Honor — Participating in the same "forlorn hope."

== See also ==
- List of Illinois Civil War units
- Illinois in the Civil War

== Notes ==
Private Frederick Fuller, Medal of Honor, Father of pioneering band leader Earl FullerDecatur Daily Republican Sat, Sep 18, 1897 ·Page (Frederick Fuller obituary,
