= Thomas L. Bunting =

American politician

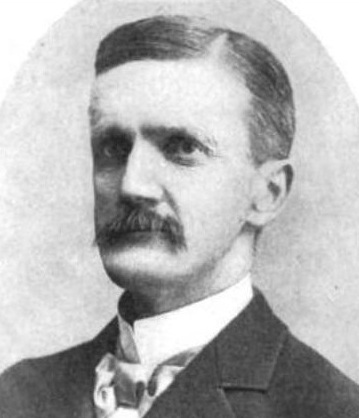

Member of the U.S. House of Representatives from New York's 33rd district
- In office March 4, 1891 – March 3, 1893
- Preceded by: John M. Wiley
- Succeeded by: Charles Daniels

Personal details
- Born: April 24, 1844 Eden, New York, U.S.
- Died: December 27, 1898 (aged 54) Buffalo, New York, U.S.
- Party: Democratic
- Occupation: general store owner, canning

Thomas Lathrop Bunting (April 24, 1844 – December 27, 1898) was an American businessman and politician who served one term as a U.S. representative from New York from 1891 to 1893.

== Biography ==
Born in Eden, New York, Bunting was educated in the common schools and the Griffith Institute, Springville, New York. He taught school in winters and attended the academy in summer months. Illness having interrupted his preparation for college, he moved to Hamburg, New York, in 1868 and later established a general mercantile store. He engaged in the canning business.

=== Congress ===
Bunting was elected as a Democrat to the Fifty-second Congress (March 4, 1891 – March 3, 1893). He declined to be a candidate for renomination in 1892.

=== Later career and death ===
He resumed the canning business and also became interested in farming, dairying, and stock raising.

He died in Buffalo, New York, on December 27, 1898. He was interred in Forest Lawn Cemetery at Hamburg, New York.

U.S. House of Representatives
Preceded by John M. Wiley	Member of the U.S. House of Representatives from New York's 33rd congressional district 1891–1893	Succeeded by Charles Daniels
