= Henry H. Crocker =

- Born: 1839; Colchester, Connecticut
- Died: March 27, 1913 (aged 73–74); Easton, Pennsylvania
- Burial place: Washington Cemetery, Washington, New Jersey
- Military career
- Allegiance: United States
- Branch: United States Army; Union Army
- Service years: 1862 - 1865
- Rank: Captain
- Unit: 2nd Massachusetts Volunteer Cavalry Regiment
- Conflicts: American Civil War • Battle of Cedar Creek
- Awards: Medal of Honor

Henry H. Crocker (January 20, 1839 – March 27, 1913) was a Union Army officer during the American Civil War. He received the Medal of Honor for gallantry during the Battle of Cedar Creek fought near Middletown, Virginia on October 19, 1864. The battle was the decisive engagement of Major General Philip Sheridan's Valley Campaigns of 1864 and was the largest battle fought in the Shenandoah Valley.

== Biography ==
Crocker was born in Colchester, Connecticut in 1839 and moved to California.

When the war broke out Crocker was living in San Francisco, California. He joined one hundred other pro-Union California men who returned east to fight. The so-called "California Hundred" were organized as a cavalry troop and sent via ship to Camp Meigs in Massachusetts. There they were designated Company A and joined by seven cavalry companies from Massachusetts to form the 2nd Massachusetts Cavalry. Crocker eventually became captain of Company F, and mustered out in July 1865.

Crocker received the Medal of Honor in 1896 for his heroism at the Battle of Cedar Creek in 1864.

He died in 1913 and is buried in Washington, New Jersey.

== Medal of Honor citation ==
"The President of the United States of America, in the name of Congress, takes pleasure in presenting the Medal of Honor to Captain Henry H. Crocker, United States Army, for extraordinary heroism on 19 October 1864, while serving with Company F, 2d Massachusetts Cavalry, in action at Cedar Creek, Virginia. Captain Crocker voluntarily led a charge, which resulted in the capture of 14 prisoners and in which he himself was wounded."

== See also ==
- List of American Civil War Medal of Honor recipients: A-F
- List of Medal of Honor recipients for the Battle of Cedar Creek
