= Edward Payson Chapin =

American lawyer

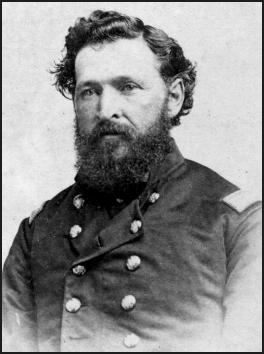
- Col. Edward Payson Chapin
- Born: August 16, 1831; Waterloo, New York
- Died: May 27, 1863 (aged 31); Port Hudson, Louisiana
- Burial place: Maple Grove Cemetery, Waterloo, New York
- Military career
- Allegiance: United States of America; Union
- Branch: United States Army; Union Army
- Service years: 1861–1863
- Rank: Colonel; Brigadier General (posthumously)
- Unit: 44th New York Infantry Regiment
- Commands: 116th New York Infantry Regiment
- Conflicts: American Civil War

Edward Payson Chapin (August 16, 1831 – May 27, 1863) was an American lawyer and soldier. He served in the Union Army during the American Civil War, and was wounded twice, both times occurring on May 27. Chapin was killed in action fighting in Louisiana, and after his death was promoted to brigadier general.

== Early life and career ==
Edward P. Chapin was born in 1831 in Waterloo, a village located in Seneca County, New York. He was the youngest of six children of Ephraim Chapin (1789 –1871), a Presbyterian minister, and of Elizabeth White Maltby (1794–1886). Chapin's siblings were named Ephraim, Eliza, Maria, Louise, and Charles.

Chapin's initial education came from a local school in Waterloo, and then he studied law at Buffalo as well as at Ballston Spa. He was admitted to New York's bar association in 1852, and then became a lawyer, practicing in Buffalo. Chapin was also part of the Niagaras, the city's first semi-pro baseball club. He was also active in the New York's militia, serving as a captain in the state forces.

== Civil War service and death ==
When the American Civil War began in 1861, Chapin chose to follow his home state and the Union cause. He was mustered into the Union Army on September 6 as a captain in the 44th New York Infantry Regiment. The 44th left New York on October 21, numbering 1,061 strong, and joined the Army of the Potomac. On January 2, 1862, Chapin was promoted to major, and he fought during the Peninsula Campaign in Virginia. On May 27 he was seriously wounded in the Battle of Hanover Court House, among the 86 casualties the 44th suffered in the fight. Chapin's performance there was praised by his commanding officer, Brig. Gen. John H. Martindale.

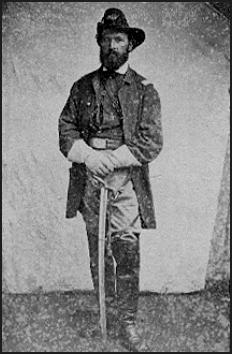
Chapin during the Civil War

On July 4, 1862, Chapin was promoted to lieutenant colonel in the 44th New York, however he resigned that day and returned home. During the convalescence from his wound, Chapin was approached by Buffalo officials requesting he raise and lead a new regiment, the 116th New York Volunteer Infantry. On September 5 Chapin was appointed commander of the 116th, with the rank of colonel. He led the regiment south to Baltimore, Maryland, where it remained until ordered to Mississippi that November.

Chapin and the 116th arrived at Ship Island, Mississippi, by sail on December 14, 1862, and by the end of the year they reached New Orleans, Louisiana. On February 9, 1863, Chapin was given brigade command in the army of Maj. Gen. Nathaniel P. Banks, operating against Confederate forces defending the Mississippi River. Chapin and his command saw action at the Battle of Plains Store on May 21, where he was again praised for his conduct by his superiors. Six days later Chapin led his brigade (part of Brig Gen. Christopher C. Augur's division) against the Confederate fortifications around Port Hudson, Louisiana, the first assaults in the Siege of Port Hudson. What happened has been described as:

After several hours of heavy Federal cannonading upon the Confederate works, at 3 pm on May 27, 1863, General Augur’s men advanced from the woods across an open area of about a mile in length obstructed by fascines, abattis, and underbrush. Colonel Chapin’s Brigade rushed forward under heavy grape, shell, and canister fire from the Confederate artillery during which Colonel Chapin, wounded in the knee early in the contest, received a mortal wound from a Minié ball in the head within a few yards of the Rebel breastworks.

After being wounded in the American Civil War with the second injury causing his death, Chapin's body was sent back to Waterloo, New York, and was buried there in the city's Maple Grove Cemetery. Four months after his death, President Abraham Lincoln sent Chapin's father a commission, appointing Chapin a brigadier general "for gallant and meritorious service at the assault on Port Hudson." The commission was dated from the day of Chapin's death, but was never confirmed by the U.S. Congress. Chapin Parkway in Buffalo, New York, was named in his honor.

== See also ==
- List of American Civil War generals (Union)
