= James Sweeney (Medal of Honor) =

- Born: September 24, 1845; Manchester, England
- Died: June 26, 1931 (aged 85); Los Angeles, California
- Burial place: Los Angeles National Cemetery
- Military career
- Allegiance: United States
- Branch: United States Army; Union Army
- Rank: Corporal
- Unit: 1st Vermont Cavalry
- Conflicts: American Civil War • Battle of Cedar Creek
- Awards: Medal of Honor

James Sweeney (September 24, 1845 – June 26, 1931) was a Union Army soldier during the American Civil War. He received the Medal of Honor for gallantry during the Battle of Cedar Creek fought near Middletown, Virginia on October 19, 1864. The battle was the decisive engagement of Major General Philip Sheridan's Valley Campaigns of 1864 and was the largest battle fought in the Shenandoah Valley.

== Military career ==
Sweeney enlisted in the 1st Vermont Cavalry (Note: The 1st Vermont Cavalry was a three years' cavalry regiment in the Union Army during the American Civil War. It served in the Eastern Theater from November 1861 to August 1865, in the Cavalry Corps, Army of the Potomac. For more information see its Wikipedia article here.) and was sworn into federal service on Tuesday, November 19, 1861. He saw service with regiment in the eastern theater. He was at the Battle of Winchester, the Battle of Gettysburg, the Third Battle of Winchester, and the Battle of Cedar Creek. A private in Company A, he captured a regimental color, an ambulance, and three officers including the mortally wounded Maj. Gen. Stephen Ramseur (Note: The mortally wounded general Ramseur, who died the next day, was born in Lincolnton, North Carolina on May 31, 1837. Ramseur studied at Davidson Collegebefore the West Point where he graduated in 1860. An ardent seccessionist and white supremecist, he was assigned to the U.S. Artillery just before the start of the war, but he resigned before his state seceded and joined the developing Confederate States Army in Alabama. An intensely devout man, he justified slavery as a divinely blessed institution, like many in the South, and by the time he entered West Point he bore great hatred for all Northerners. An injury from a horse fall delayed his joining the Army of Northern Virginia until the Peninsula Campaign in the spring of 1862. He had campaigned through all of Lee's campaigns from thence on. For more information see his Wikipedia article here.) at Cedar Creek for which he was awarded the Medal of Honor.

== Medal of Honor citation ==
Rank and organization: Private, Company A, 1st Vermont Cavalry. Place and date: At Cedar Creek, Virginia, October 19, 1864. Entered service at: Burlington, Vermont. Born: September 24, 1845, Manchester, England. Date of issue: November 26, 1864.

Citation:

The President of the United States of America, in the name of Congress, takes pleasure in presenting the Medal of Honor to Corporal Frederick A. Lyon, United States Army, for extraordinary heroism on 19 October 1864, while serving with Company A, 1st Vermont Cavalry, in action at Cedar Creek, Virginia. With one companion, Corporal Lyon captured the flag of a Confederate regiment, three officers, and an ambulance with its mules and driver.

The companion mentioned in his citation was corporal Frederick A. Lyon, who also received the Medal of Honor. Sweeney was sent to Washington, D.C., with the captured Confederate battle flag. He was personally introduced to Secretary of War Edwin M. Stanton by General George Custer. Stanton personally presented the Medal of Honor to Sweeney, who was also promoted to corporal.

== See also ==
- List of Medal of Honor recipients
- List of American Civil War Medal of Honor recipients: Q-S
