= 2nd Massachusetts Cavalry Regiment =

2nd Regiment, Massachusetts Volunteer Cavalry
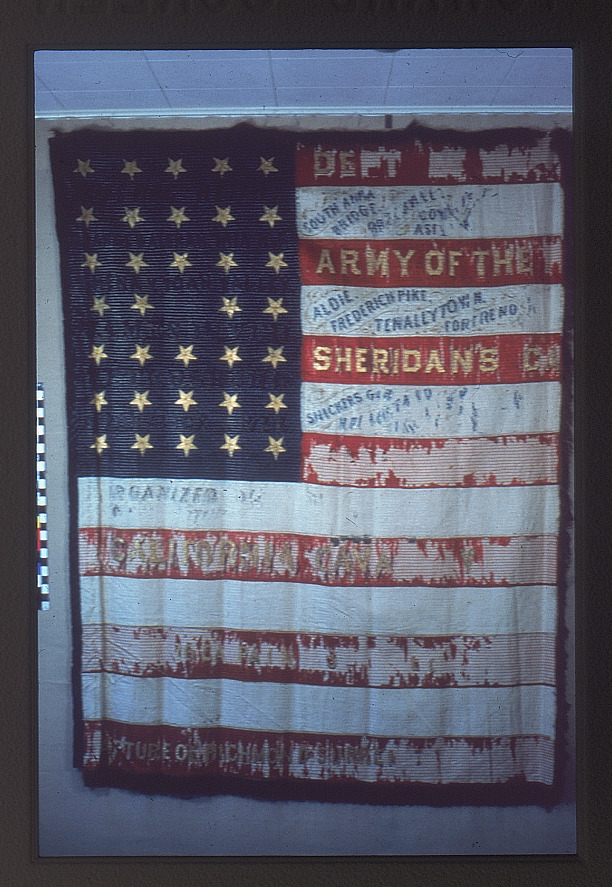
- National color of the regiment
- Active: December 10, 1862 to July 20, 1865
- Country: United States of America
- Allegiance: Union
- Branch: United States Army
- Type: Cavalry
- Engagements: Third Battle of Winchester; Battle of Fisher's Hill; Battle of Cedar Creek

The 2nd Massachusetts Volunteer Cavalry Regiment was a regiment of cavalry troops in the Union army during the American Civil War. It consisted primarily of men from the states of California and Massachusetts, and served in the Eastern Theater, despite its western roots.

== History ==
Politicians at the start of the Civil War began raising volunteer troops in response to President Abraham Lincoln's call to arms to force the return of the Confederate States of America to the Union. Owing to political divisions at the time of the Civil War and to the limited transportation facilities for moving troops great distances, the Lincoln administration did not request California troops for Eastern battlefields but instead called for volunteers to replace regular troops stationed at western garrisons. In the late summer of 1862, a small number of men in California who had been raised in the East decided to enlist in the army, but wanted to serve in the Eastern Theater. They contacted Governor John Andrew of Massachusetts in the late summer of 1862 and offered to raise a company of 100 cavalrymen to serve in a state regiment. Andrews agreed on the condition the Californians would provide their own uniforms and equipment and pay for their own passage to Boston.

The so-called "California Hundred" was organized in San Francisco on December 10, 1862, and took a ship to the East Coast, arriving at Camp Meigs in Readville, Massachusetts, on January 4, 1863. They were designated as Company A, and soon were joined by seven companies of Massachusetts. The Californians and four of the local companies were moved in mid-February to Baltimore, Maryland, then to Fort Monroe and numerous other locations in Virginia, where they primarily engaged in picketing, scouting, and outpost duty until July 1863. Commanded by James Sewall Reed, the Californians first took to the field near Yorktown, Virginia. From July 1863 to July 1864, the California Hundred engaged in numerous skirmishes with John S. Mosby's Confederate partisan rangers in the Loudoun Valley.

In February and March 1863, another 400 Californians were recruited and sent to Massachusetts to form Companies E, F, L, and M (the "California Battalion") of the 2nd Massachusetts Cavalry. They arrived in the Bay State on April 16, 1863, completing the full complement of the regiment. They moved to Washington, D.C., in May and Colonel Charles Russell Lowell was given command.

In August 1863, the regiment was combined in Centreville, Virginia, and became a part of King's Division in the XXII Corps. They later served in the Army of the Shenandoah under Philip H. Sheridan during the Valley Campaigns of 1864. Among the many actions that the 2nd Massachusetts Cavalry participated in were the battles of Fort Stevens, Opequon, Tom's Brook, and Cedar Creek. The following spring in 1865, by now under command of Colonel Caspar Crowninshield, it participated in the Siege of Petersburg. In the subsequent Appomattox Campaign it pursued elements of the retreating Army of Northern Virginia, then marched in the Grand Review of the Armies in Washington on May 23. The men were mustered out July 20, 1865, at Fairfax Court House, Virginia, before returning to California and Massachusetts in the weeks that followed.

The regiment lost during its service 8 officers and 82 enlisted men killed and mortally wounded, and 3 officers and 138 enlisted men by disease for a total of 231. Of the original California Hundred's 3 officers and 101 enlisted men, 40 were present the day the company disbanded. About 12 had died, others were discharged because of sickness or wounds or were transferred to other units, and 10 deserted, a greater desertion rate than from any other Massachusetts regiment.

Two men of the regiment were awarded the Medal of Honor for gallantry in the Valley Campaigns of 1864. The two men were:

- Private Philip Baybutt at Luray, Virginia
- Captain Henry H. Crocker at the Battle of Cedar Creek

== Flags ==
The regiment carried many flags, with most of them being made by Daniel Norcross. Some of the companies carried their own flags like Company A, E, and M. The regiment also carried 2 regimental colors one bearing the Massachusetts state seal and the other California state seal.

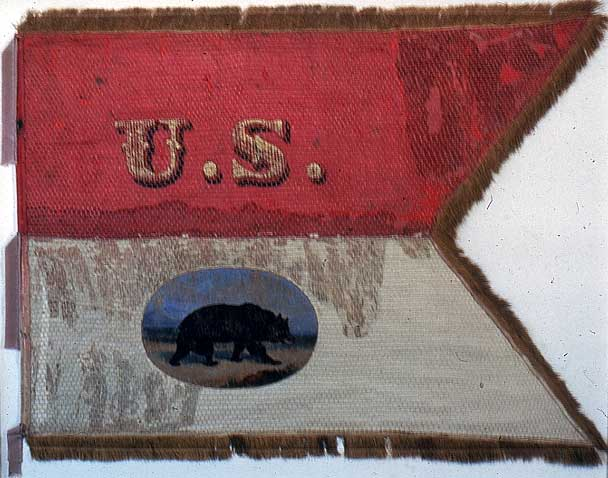
Guidon used by Company A

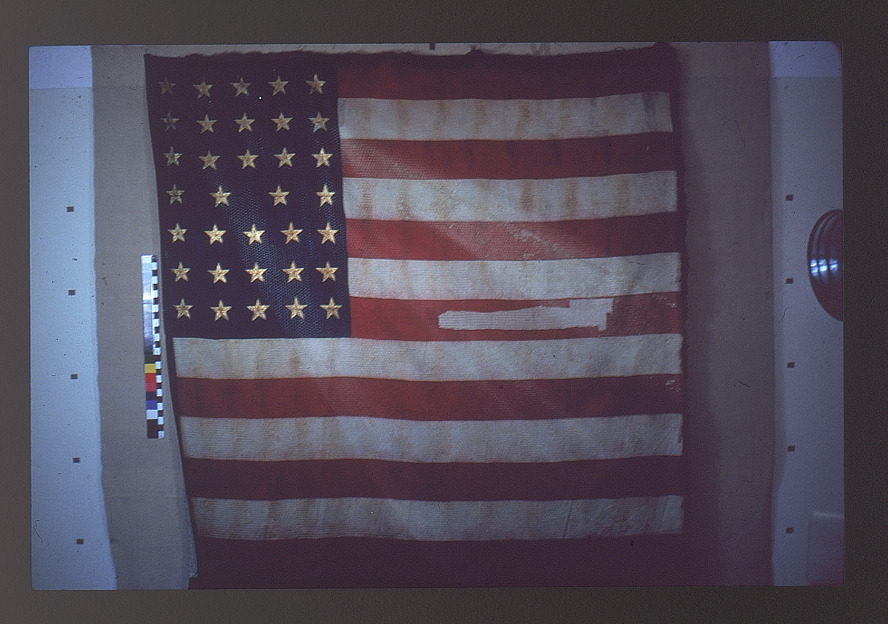
Flag made by Miss Lord Abbie and present to members of the regiment on January 14, 1863. It was later used for Captain Reed's funeral

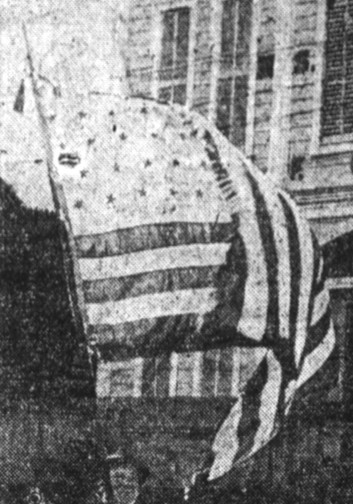
Another flag carried by Company A, with a white canton resting on the blood stripe.

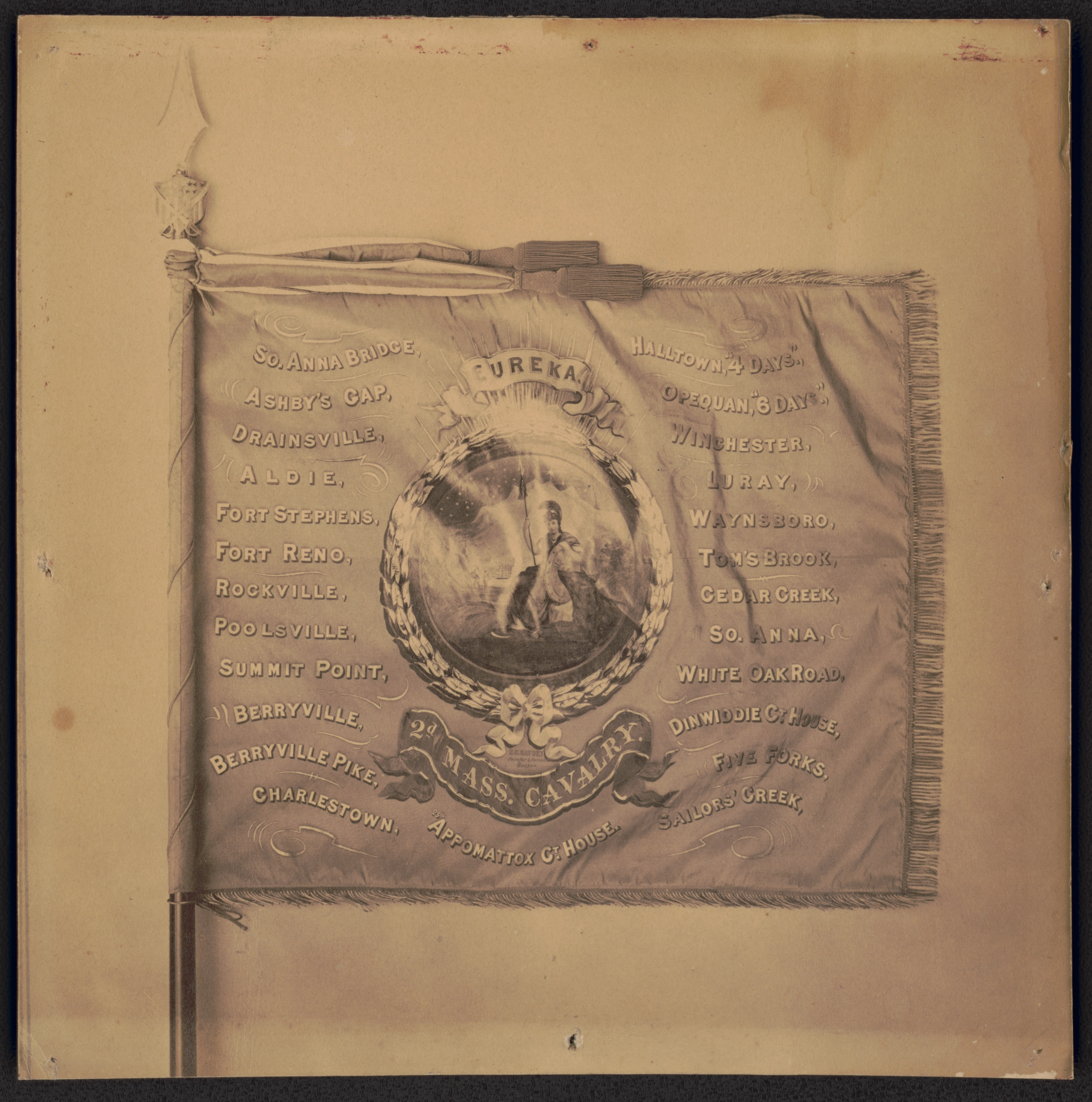
Regimental flag of Co. A, 2nd Massachusetts Cavalry Regiment. From the Liljenquist Family Collection of Civil War Photographs, Prints and Photographs Division, Library of Congress

Digital reconstruction of the flag carried by Hattie Reed

Digital reconstruction of the 31-star American Flag carried by Company K, c.1865

Guidon used by Company C

== See also ==
- List of Massachusetts Civil War Units
- Massachusetts in the American Civil War
