= Richard Taylor (Medal of Honor) =

American Civil War Medal of Honor recipient (1834–1890)

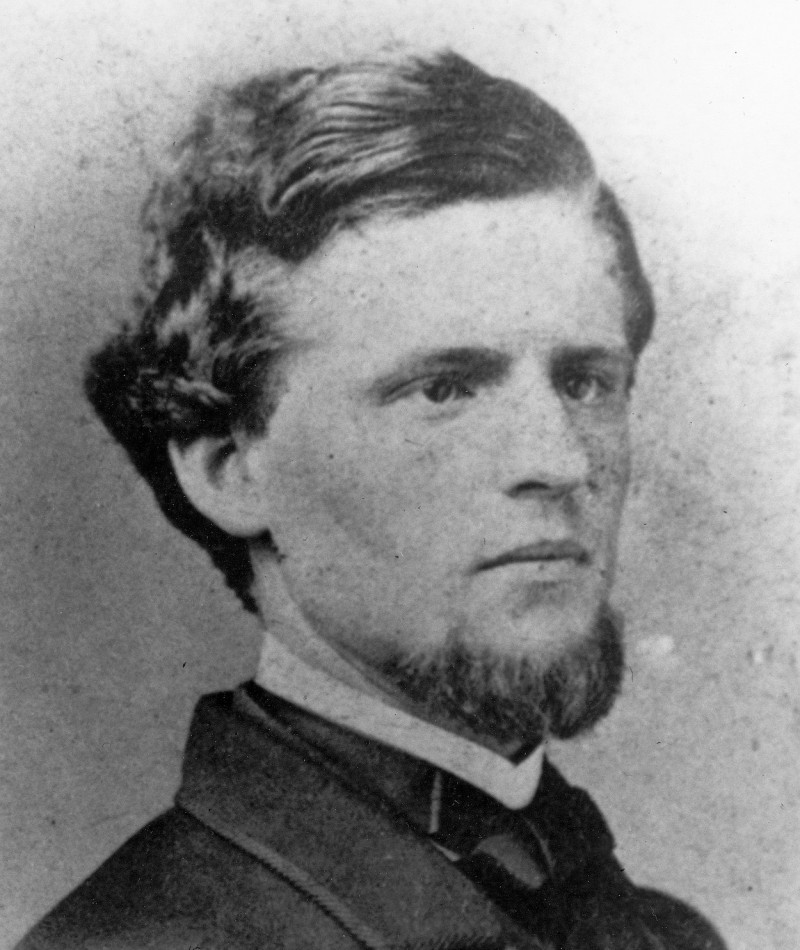
- Born: c. 1834; Madison County, Alabama
- Died: 1890; Washington, Indiana
- Military career
- Allegiance: United States
- Branch: United States Army; Union Army
- Service years: 1861–1865
- Rank: Private
- Unit: 18th Indiana Infantry
- Conflicts: American Civil War • Battle of Cedar Creek
- Awards: Medal of Honor

Richard Taylor (c. 1834–1890) was a Union Army soldier during the American Civil War. He received the Medal of Honor for gallantry during the Battle of Cedar Creek fought near Middletown, Virginia on October 19, 1864. The battle was the decisive engagement of Major General Philip Sheridan's Valley Campaigns of 1864 and was the largest battle fought in the Shenandoah Valley.

Taylor joined the Army from Indiana in August 1861, and mustered out with his regiment in August 1865.

== Medal of Honor citation ==

"The President of the United States of America, in the name of Congress, takes pleasure in presenting the Medal of Honor to Private Richard Taylor, United States Army, for extraordinary heroism on 19 October 1864, while serving with Company E, 18th Indiana Infantry, in action at Cedar Creek, Virginia, for capture of flag."

== See also ==
- List of Medal of Honor recipients
- List of American Civil War Medal of Honor recipients: T–Z
