= Frederick A. Lyon =

American soldier

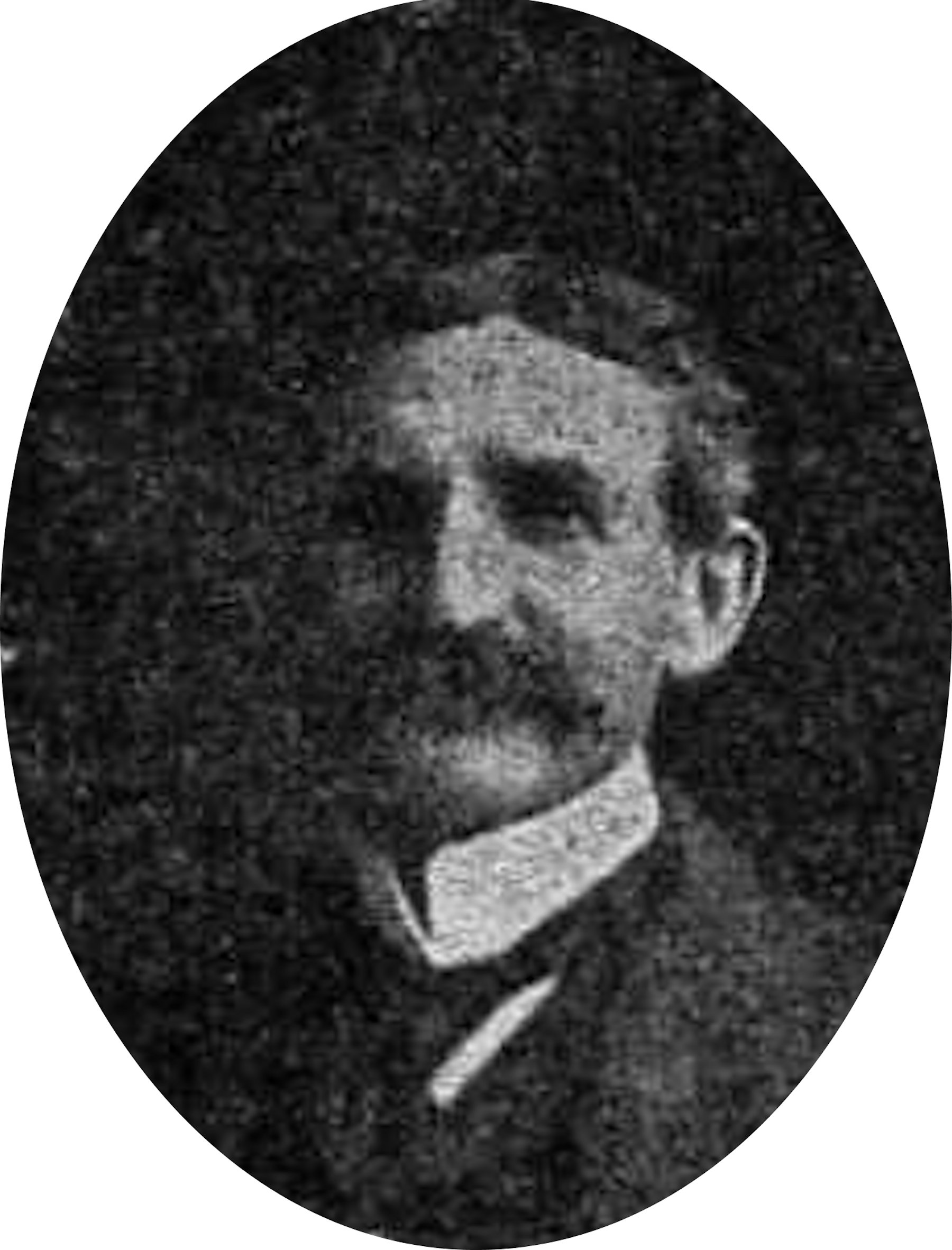
- Born: June 25, 1843; Williamsburg, Massachusetts, US
- Died: September 23, 1911 (aged 68); Jackson, Michigan, US
- Burial place: Mount Evergreen Cemetery, Jackson, Michigan, US
- Military career
- Allegiance: United States; Union
- Branch: United States Army; Union Army
- Rank: Sergeant
- Units: Company A, 1st Vermont Volunteer Cavalry Regiment
- Conflicts: American Civil War
- Awards: Medal of Honor

Frederick A. Lyon (June 25, 1843 – September 23, 1911) was a soldier in the Union Army and a Medal of Honor recipient for his actions in the American Civil War.

== Military career ==
Lyon enlisted in the 1st Vermont Cavalry (Note: The 1st Vermont Cavalry was a three years' cavalry regiment in the Union Army during the American Civil War. It served in the Eastern Theater from November 1861 to August 1865, in the Cavalry Corps, Army of the Potomac. For more information see its Wikipedia article here.) and was sworn into federal service on Tuesday, November 19, 1861. He saw service with regiment in the eastern theater. He was at the Battle of Winchester, the Battle of Gettysburg, the Third Battle of Winchester, and the Battle of Cedar Creek. As a corporal in Company A, he captured the mortally wounded Maj. Gen. Stephen Ramseur (Note: The mortally wounded general Ramseur, who died the next day, was born in Lincolnton, North Carolina on May 31, 1837. Ramseur studied at Davidson Collegebefore the West Point where he graduated in 1860. An ardent seccessionist and white supremecist, he was assigned to the U.S. Artillery just before the start of the war, but he resigned before his state seceded and joined the developing Confederate States Army in Alabama. An intensely devout man, he justified slavery as a divinely blessed institution, like many in the South, and by the time he entered West Point he bore great hatred for all Northerners. An injury from a horse fall delayed his joining the Army of Northern Virginia until the Peninsula Campaign in the spring of 1862. He had campaigned through all of Lee's campaigns from thence on. For more information see his Wikipedia article here.) at Cedar Creek for which he was awarded the Medal of Honor.

== Medal of Honor citation ==
Rank and organization: Corporal, Company A, 1st Vermont Cavalry. Place and date: At Cedar Creek, Virginia, October 19, 1864. Entered service at: Burlington, Vermont. Born: June 25, 1843, Williamsburg, Massachusetts. Date of issue: November 26, 1864.

Citation:

The President of the United States of America, in the name of Congress, takes pleasure in presenting the Medal of Honor to Corporal Frederick A. Lyon, United States Army, for extraordinary heroism on 19 October 1864, while serving with Company A, 1st Vermont Cavalry, in action at Cedar Creek, Virginia. With one companion, Corporal Lyon captured the flag of a Confederate regiment, three officers, and an ambulance with its mules and driver.

The companion mentioned in his citation was private James Sweeney, who also received the Medal of Honor. Lyon was sent to Washington, D.C., with the captured Confederate battle flag. He was personally introduced to Secretary of War Edwin M. Stanton by General George Custer. Stanton personally presented the Medal of Honor to Lyon, who was also promoted to sergeant.

== Death ==
Lyon's grave at Mount Evergreen Cemetery

Lyon died on September 23, 1911, in Jackson, Michigan. He was buried nearby in Mount Evergreen Cemetery (Soldier's field G-9).

== See also ==
- List of Medal of Honor recipients
- List of American Civil War Medal of Honor recipients: G–L
