= 116th New York Infantry Regiment =

- Active: July 14, 1862 - June 26, 1865
- Country: United States
- Allegiance: Union
- Branch: Infantry
- Engagements: Siege of Port Hudson; Battle of Kock's Plantation; Red River Campaign; Battle of Sabine Cross Roads; Battle of Pleasant Hill; Battle of Fort Stevens; Third Battle of Winchester; Battle of Fisher's Hill; Battle of Cedar Creek

The 116th New York Infantry Regiment was an infantry regiment in the Union Army during the American Civil War.

== Service ==
The 116th New York Infantry was organized at Camp Morgan in Buffalo, New York beginning July 14, 1862 and mustered in August 10 - September 3, 1862 for three-years service under the command of Colonel Edward Payson Chapin.

The regiment was attached to Emery's Brigade, VIII Corps, Baltimore, Maryland, Middle Department, to November 1862. Emery's Brigade, Banks' Louisiana Expedition, to December 1862. Sherman's Division, Department of the Gulf, to January 1863. 1st Brigade, 3rd Division, XIX Corps, Department of the Gulf, to February 1863. 1st Brigade, 1st Division, XIX Corps, to July 1864. 1st Brigade, 1st Division, XIX Corps, Army of the Shenandoah, Middle Military Division, to March 1865. 1st Brigade, Dwight's 1st Division (Provisional), Army of the Shenandoah, to April 1865. 1st Brigade, Dwight's Division, Department of Washington, to June 1865.

The 116th New York Infantry mustered out of service June 8, 1865 and was discharged June 26, 1865 at Buffalo, New York. Recruits and veterans were transferred to the 90th New York Infantry.

== Detailed service ==
Left Buffalo for Baltimore, Md., September 5. Camp at Druid's Hill Park, Baltimore, until November 5, 1862. Movement into Pennsylvania against Stuart October 12–15. Reached Gettysburg, Pa., October 15. Ordered to Join Banks' Expedition and embarked on the steamer Atlantic for Fort Monroe, Va., November 6. Sailed for Ship Island, Miss., December 4. Moved to Carrollton December 30, then to Baton Rouge, La., February 3, 1863. Operations against Port Hudson, La., March 7–27. Moved to Winter's Plantation March 16–22. Duty at Baton Rouge until May 19. Advance on Port Hudson May 19–24. Action at Plain's Store May 21. Siege of Port Hudson May 24-July 9. Assaults on Port Hudson May 27 and June 14. Surrender of Port Hudson July 9. Expedition to Donaldsville July 9–30. Action at Kock's Plantation, Bayou LaFourche, July 12–13. Moved to Baton Rouge August 1, then to New Orleans August 28. Sabine Pass Expedition September 4–12. Moved to Brashear City September 17. Western Louisiana Campaign October 3-November 30. Camp at New Iberia November 17, 1863 to January 8, 1864. Moved to Franklin January 8, and duty there until March 15. Red River Campaign March 15-May 22. Advance from Franklin to Alexandria March 15–26. Battle of Sabine Cross Roads April 8. Pleasant Hill April 9. Monett's Ferry, Cane River Crossing, April 23. Construction of dam at Alexandria April 30-May 10. Retreat to Morganza May 13–20. Mansura May 16. Camp at Morganza until July. Ordered to Fort Monroe, Va., July 2, then to Washington July 12. Snicker's Gap Expedition July 14–23. Sheridan's Shenandoah Valley Campaign August 7-November 28. Battle of Winchester September 19. Fisher's Hill September 22. Battle of Cedar Creek October 19. Duty near Middletown until November 9, and near Newtown until December 30. At Stephenson's Depot until April 5, 1865. Moved to Washington, D.C., and duty there until June. Grand Review of the Armies May 23–24.

== Casualties ==
The regiment lost a total of 222 men during service; 5 officers and 91 enlisted men killed or mortally wounded, 2 officers and 124 enlisted men died of disease.

== Commanders ==
- Colonel Edward Payson Chapin - killed in action at the Siege of Port Hudson
- Colonel George M. Love

== Notable members ==
- Colonel George M. Love - Medal of Honor recipient for action at the Battle of Cedar Creek

== See also ==
- List of New York Civil War regiments
- New York in the Civil War
