= 44th New York Infantry Regiment =

- Active: August 30, 1861, to October 11, 1864
- Country: United States
- Allegiance: Union
- Branch: Infantry
- Nickname: "Ellsworth's Avengers"
- Engagements: Peninsular Campaign; Siege of Yorktown; Battle of Hanover Court House; Battle of Mechanicsville; Battle of Gaines' Mill; Battle of Malvern Hill; Second Battle of Bull Run; Maryland Campaign; Battle of South Mountain; Battle of Antietam; Battle of Fredericksburg; Battle of Chancellorsville; Battle of Gettysburg; Overland Campaign; Battle of the Wilderness; Battle of Cold Harbor; Siege of Petersburg

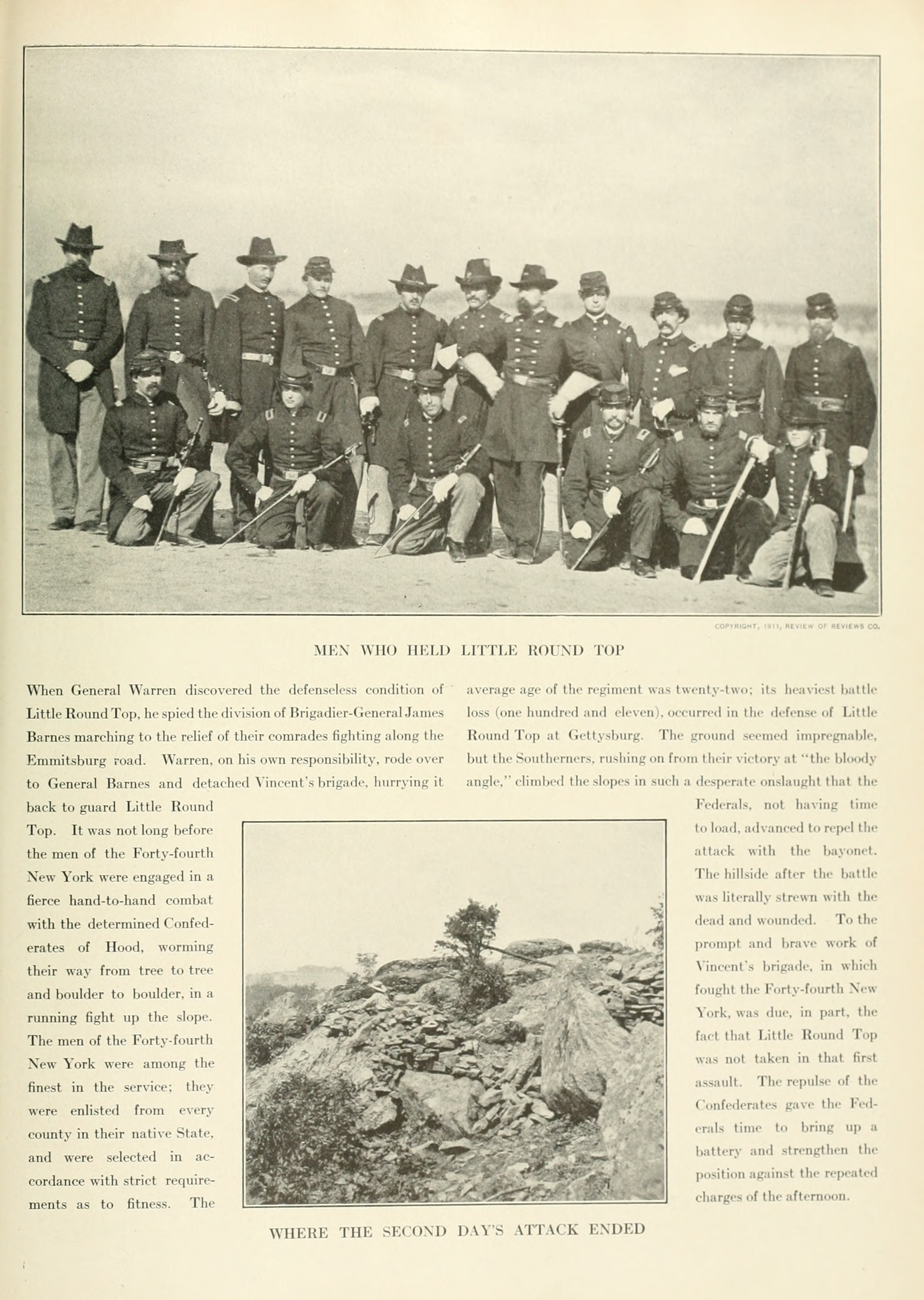
Men of the 44th Regiment at the Little Round Top

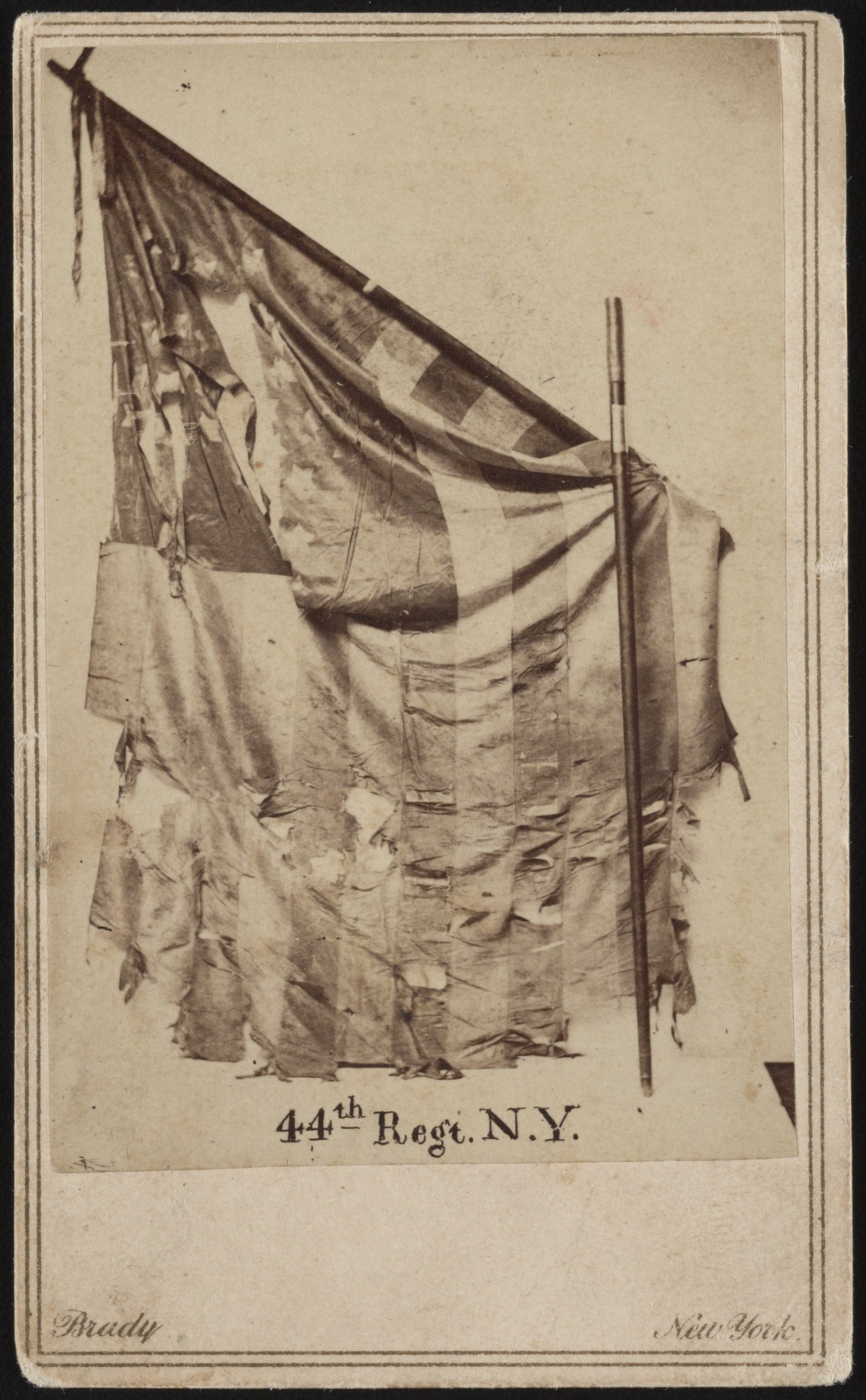
Tattered Union flag of the 44th New York Infantry Regiment) - Brady, New York LCCN2017660635.jpg. From the Liljenquist Family Collection of Civil War Photographs, Prints and Photographs Division, Library of Congress. Photograph by Mathew Brady

The 44th New York Infantry Regiment was a regiment of the Union Army during the American Civil War which was formed up at Albany in mid-1861, and mustered in on August 30, 1861. The regiment wore an americanized zouave uniform which consisted of a dark blue zouave jacket with red piping on the cuffs, dark blue trousers with a red stripe, a red zouave shirt, a dark blue forage cap, and a pair of leather gaiters. The jacket had buttons down the front of it which was not part of the original French zouave uniform.

== Service ==
The regiment was first mustered by Stephen W. Stryker, a former lieutenant in the 11th New York Volunteer Infantry Regiment, in part to remember his former commander, Colonel Elmer Ellsworth in Alexandria, Virginia, the first officer to die in the war. The regiment became known as "Ellsworth's Avengers". Several other members of the regiments were members of Ellsworth's Chicago Zouave Cadets, including Colonel Freeman Conner, Major Edward B. Knox and Captain Lucius Larrabee, who commanded Company B and was killed at Gettysburg.

The regiment first saw action in the Peninsular Campaign and by October 1862, battle deaths and disease had left only 200 men of the regiment's original strength of 1100 members. During the Battle of Gaines' Mill Col. Rice captured a rebel flag with the inscription “Seven Pines.”

They were one of four regiments in the 3rd Brigade, 1st Division, V Corps, Army of the Potomac, commanded by lieutenant colonel Strong Vincent, which fought during the Battle of Gettysburg. On July 2, 1863, at around 4:00 p.m., the second day of the battle, the 3rd Brigade began a heroic defense of Little Round Top, the extreme left flank of the Union Line.

The 44th New York mustered out on October 11, 1864, with the veterans and recruits being transferred to the 140th and 146th New York Volunteers.

== Commanders ==
- Colonel Stephen W. Stryker
- Colonel James Clay Rice
- Colonel Freeman Conner

== See also ==
- List of New York Civil War regiments
- John B. Weber
