= Charles Norton =

Charles Norton may refer to:

- Charles Norton (solicitor) (1896–1974), English solicitor and mayor
- Charles D. Norton (1871–1923), American banker and government official
- Charles Davis Norton (1820–1867), American lawyer and government official
- Charles Eliot Norton (1827–1908), American author, social critic, and professor of art
- Charles Hotchkiss Norton (1851–1942), American mechanical engineer and designer of machine tools
- Charles Phelps Norton (1858–1923), chancellor of the University at Buffalo
- Charles Francis Norton (1807–1835), member of parliament for Guildford
- Charles B. Norton (1825–1891), American archivist, historian and publisher
