= Peter M. Dox =

American politician

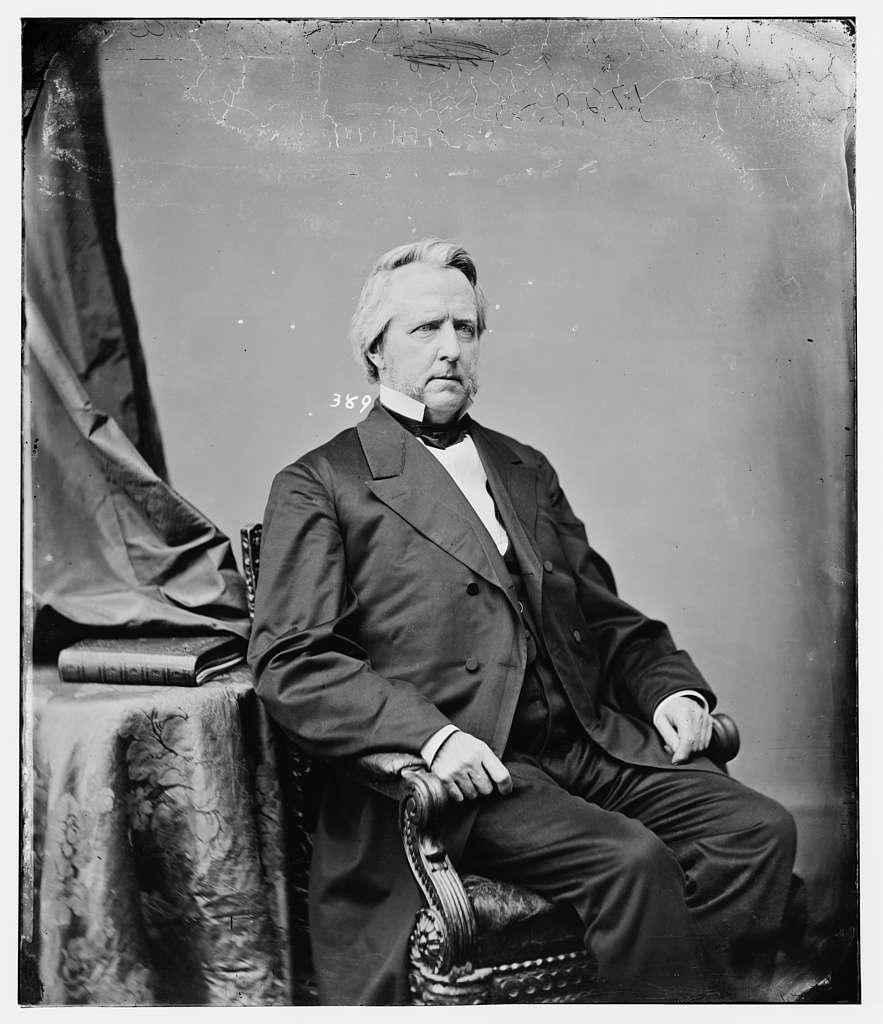
- Congressman Peter Myndert Dox

Member of the U.S. House of Representatives from Alabama's 5th district
- In office March 4, 1869 – March 3, 1873
- Preceded by: John Benton Callis
- Succeeded by: John Henry Caldwell

Personal details
- Born: Peter Myndert Dox; September 11, 1813 Geneva, New York
- Died: April 2, 1891 (aged 77) Huntsville, Alabama
- Party: Democratic
- Relations: Myndert M. Dox (uncle); Gerrit L. Dox (uncle); John Nicholas (grandfather)
- Education: Hobart College

Peter Myndert Dox (September 11, 1813 – April 2, 1891) was an American politician who served the state of Alabama in the U.S. House of Representatives between 1869 and 1873.

== Early life ==
Dox was born in Geneva, Ontario County, New York on September 11, 1813. He was the eldest child of Abraham Dox and Anne Cary (née Nicholas) Dox. Among his siblings were John Nicolas Dox, Mary Blair Dox (wife of Timothy Fales Wardwell), Anne Nicholas Dox, and Ernest B. Dox.

His paternal grandfather was merchant and skipper Pieter Dox, who served in the French and Indian War and the Revolutionary War. His paternal uncles included Myndert M. Dox, Collector of the Port of Buffalo, and Gerrit L. Dox, New York State Treasurer. His maternal grandfather was U.S. Representative John Nicholas from Virginia's 18th district.

He graduated from Hobart College in Geneva in 1833.

== Career ==
He studied law, was admitted to the bar, and practiced at Geneva. Dox served as a member of the New York State Assembly in 1842, and as a Know Nothing judge of the Ontario County courts from November 1855 until his resignation on March 18, 1856. He then moved to Alabama and settled in Madison County, where he engaged in agricultural pursuits.

Dox was a delegate to the Alabama constitutional convention of 1865. In 1868, he was elected as a Democrat to the U.S. House of Representatives, and reelected for the following term, serving until 1873.

== Personal life ==
On October 12, 1854, Dox married Matilda Walker Pope (1826–1871). After the death of his first wife in 1871, he married Margaret Simpson.

He retired from public life, and died in Huntsville on April 2, 1891. He is buried in Maple Hill Cemetery in Huntsville.

U.S. House of Representatives
Preceded by John Benton Callis	Member of the U.S. House of Representatives from Alabama's 5th congressional district 1869-1873	Succeeded by John Henry Caldwell
