= Oliver Forward =

American politician (1781–1834)

The Honorable Oliver Forward

Member of the New York State Senate for the Western District
- In office July 1, 1820 – December 31, 1822

Member of the New York State Assembly
- In office July 1, 1819 – June 30, 1820 Serving with Elial T. Foote
- Preceded by: Philo Orton; Isaac Phelps
- Succeeded by: William Hotchkiss; Jediah Prendergast

Collector of the Port of Buffalo
- In office 1812–1822
- Appointed by: James Madison
- Preceded by: Erastus Granger
- Succeeded by: Myndert M. Dox

Personal details
- Born: Oliver Owen Forward; December 1, 1781 Simsbury, Connecticut
- Died: April 27, 1834 (aged 53) Buffalo, New York
- Party: Democratic-Republican
- Spouse: Sally Granger
- Relations: Walter Forward (brother); Chauncey Forward (brother)

Oliver Owen Forward JP (December 1, 1781 – April 27, 1834) was an early settler and government official in Buffalo, New York.

== Early life ==
Forward was born in Simsbury, Connecticut in 1781. He was a son of Judge Samuel Forward (1752–1821) and Susannah (née Holcomb) Forward (1753–1832). Among his siblings were younger brothers U.S. Representatives Walter Forward and Chauncey Forward. During John Tyler's administration, Walter served as the 15th Secretary of the Treasury and during the administrations of Zachary Taylor and Millard Fillmore, he served as the Minister to Denmark. Other siblings included Julia Forward, Rensselaer Forward and Dryden Forward, who both became lawyers but died young.

His grandfather was Abel Forward of East Granby, a son of Samuel Forward, who emigrated from England in the 1600s and settled in Windsor, Connecticut.

In February 1803, Oliver travelled west to Aurora, Ohio with his father and family arriving later in the year after his father sold his Connecticut possessions. His father later became a Judge in Aurora.

== Career ==
After roughly six years in Ohio, he moved to Buffalo, New York through the influence of his brother-in-law, Erastus Granger, who was the Collector of the Port of Buffalo and agent for the Indian tribes in Western New York. Upon his arrival, Forward became Deputy Collector and Assistant Postmaster and was appointed Justice of the Peace. In 1812, Forward was appointed by President James Madison to succeed Granger as Collector of the Port of Buffalo, and the following year, the village of Buffalo was incorporated by the legislature. In 1817, Forward, as Collector of the Port, was authorized by the Treasury Department to purchase a site for a light house. Forward negotiated with Joseph Ellicott, agent of the Holland Land Company, to purchase the property near the outlet of the Buffalo Creek for $350. In 1822, President James Monroe appointed Myndert M. Dox to replace Forward.

For many years, Forward served as director of the Bank of Niagara, including a few years as Cashier of the bank, "the expectation being that his name and influence might in some way retrieve the fortunes of that institution."

In 1817, he was appointed of the Judges of Niagara County of which he also served as treasurer for many years (before Erie County was organized). In 1819, he was elected as a Clintonian Democratic-Republican (which was split into two factions: Clintonians, supporters of Gov. DeWitt Clinton and the Bucktails led by Martin Van Buren) to the New York State Assembly as a delegate from the district containing Chautauqua, Cattaraugus and Niagara Counties (in which Erie was then created). In the Assembly, he was a leading voice towards the creation of the Erie Canal. In the spring of 1820, he was elected to the State Senate to represent one of nine seats in the Western District (which consisted of Allegany, Broome, Cattaraugus, Cayuga, Chautauqua, Cortland, Genesee, Madison, Niagara, Oneida, Onondaga, Ontario, Oswego, Seneca, Steuben, Tioga and Tompkins counties). At the close of the session of 1822, on his return to Buffalo, Forward was again elected chairman of the board of trustees of the village of Buffalo and was again reelected in 1823 and 1824. The city of Buffalo was officially organized in spring 1832, and a committee on the charter was created, on which Forward served "as a representative from the first ward" and was elected chairman.

When the Marquis de Lafayette visited the U.S. in 1825, he arrived in Buffalo aboard the steamboat Superior on June 4, 1825 and Forward addressed and welcomed him on behalf of Buffalo's citizens.

== Personal life ==
In the Spring of 1803, he married Sally Granger of Suffield, Connecticut, a daughter of Abner Granger and Experiance (née King) Granger. Before 1811, he built a small one-story house on Pearl Street in Buffalo with an addition on the side to carry on the business of the post office and collectorship. He lived there until December 1813 when the British burned the city during the War of 1812. The villagers returned in Spring 1814 and Forward constructed a two-story brick house, again on Pearl Street, that was "considered the most elegant residence" in Buffalo. Together, they were the parents of several children, including:

- Julia Forward (1814–1888), who married Henry R. Williams. After his death in 1853, she married merchant Ambrose Spencer Sterling, son of Ansel Sterling, in 1858.

His wife died in December 1831. In the summer of 1832, he suffered from an attack of cholera, never fully regaining his strength. Forward died in Buffalo on April 27, 1834. He was buried in his brother-in-law's family burial lot, which eventually became Forest Lawn Cemetery, Buffalo after Granger's widow sold it to Charles E. Clarke in 1849.

Government offices
| Preceded by Erastus Granger | Collector of the Port of Buffalo; 1812–1822 | Succeeded by Myndert M. Dox |
