= South Buffalo North Side Light =

South Buffalo North Side Light South Buffalo North Side Light
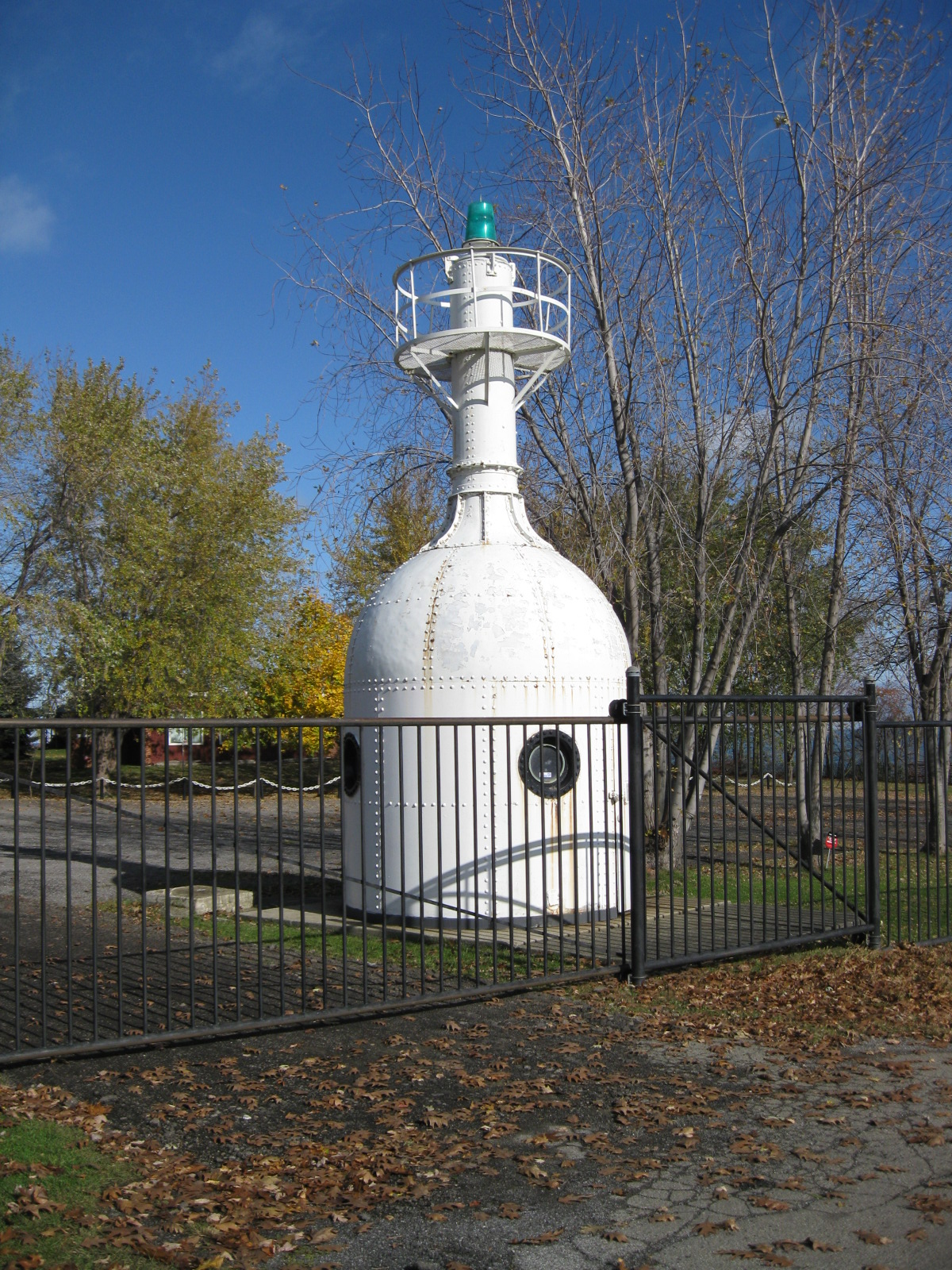
- South Buffalo North Side Light, November 2009
- Location: Buffalo Harbor, Dunkirk, New York
- Coordinates: 42°50′7″N 78°52′3″W

Tower
- Foundation: Concrete base on pier
- Construction: boiler plate
- Automated: 1960
- Height: 29 feet (8.8 m)
- Shape: Bottle
- Heritage: National Register of Historic Places listed place

Light
- First lit: 1903
- Deactivated: 1985
- South Buffalo North Side Light
- U.S. National Register of Historic Places
- MPS: U.S. Coast Guard Lighthouses and Light Stations on the Great Lakes TR
- NRHP reference No.: 83001673
- Added to NRHP: August 04, 1983

South Buffalo North Side Light is a lighthouse formerly located at the entrance to Buffalo Harbor, Buffalo, New York. It is one of two "bottle shaped" beacons located in Buffalo Harbor; the other is the Buffalo North Breakwater South End Light. It is a 29-foot-high (8.8 m) beacon constructed of boiler plate. It measures 10 feet 3/4 inch (3.067 m) at the bottom and 2 feet 3 inches (0.69 m) at the top. It is distinguished by four cast-iron port windows and a curved iron door. It was first lit on September 1, 1903, and originally equipped with a 6th-order Fresnel lens. A battery-operated 12-volt lamp with a 12-inch (300 mm) green plastic lens was installed in the beacon c. 1960, when a domed roof formerly mounted over the lens was removed. The beacon was removed in 1985, and now stands at the gate to the Dunkirk Lighthouse and Veterans Park Museum. Its twin is located on the grounds of the Buffalo (main) Light.

It was listed on the National Register of Historic Places in 1983.
