= Henry W. Brendel =

American lawyer, government official

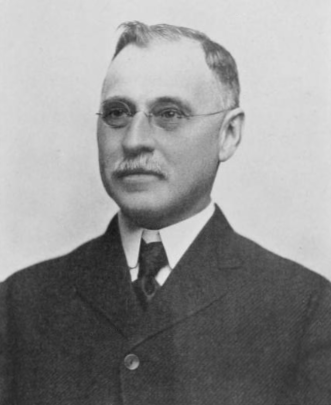
- c. 1908

Collector of the Port of Buffalo
- In office 1898–1906
- Appointed by: William McKinley
- Preceded by: Peter C. Doyle
- Succeeded by: Fred O. Murray

Personal details
- Born: December 10, 1857 Buffalo, New York, US
- Died: September 14, 1940 (aged 82) Buffalo, New York, US
- Party: Republican
- Spouse: Augusta Haupt (m. 1891)
- Children: 2

Military service
- Branch/service: New York National Guard
- Rank: Captain
- Battles/wars: Spanish–American War

Captain Henry William Brendel (December 10, 1857 – September 14, 1940) was an American lawyer and government official.

== Early life ==
Brendel was born on December 10, 1857, in Buffalo, New York. He was a son of Christine (née Brost) Brendel and Peter Brendel, who was born in Bavaria and came to Bufalo in the 1850s where he learned the copper trade.

With the exception of two years in a parochial school, where he was instructed in both German and English, he received his education in the public schools of Buffalo. In 1875, he began the study of law in the office of Hawkins & Fisher for one year before completing his studies in the office of Delavan F. Clark.

== Career ==
After being admitted to the bar in January 1879 before going into partnership with Gen. James Clark Strong in fall 1879. They practiced together until 1891 when the firm was dissolved and Brendel continued the practice alone for a number of years, before going into partnership with Frank W. Standart (later a member of the New York State Assembly. Afterwards, his former partner Clark "went abroad and lectured through England on the North American Indian." He became an active leader of the Republican Party, serving as a member of the Executive Committee and as Treasurer. He was thrice nominated for the Assembly but "his district having a large Democratic majority, he was defeated."

In early 1896, he was appointed excise attorney for Erie County. In October 1897, Brendel was appointed by President William McKinley to succeed Peter C. Doyle as Collector of the Port of Buffalo. He served in this role until 1906, through McKinley and into Theodore Roosevelt's administration. He was succeeded by Fred O. Murray in 1906.

Afterwards, he continued the practice of law, retaining an active interest in Brendel, Standart and Bagot in the Mutual Life Building, until his death in 1940.

=== Military service ===
In 1878, Brendel enlisted as a private into Company D of the 74th Regiment of the National Guard of the State of New York. He saw service during the Buffalo switchmen's strike in 1892 and in the Tonawanda lumber strike of 1893. In August 1895, he received a gold medal for 25 years of service in the National Guard. At the outbreak of the Spanish–American War, he was commissioned Second Lieutenant and, later, as Captain of Company I, 65th Regiment, and went to the front. He remained in the service until November 17, 1898, when the regiment was mustered out of service.

== Personal life ==
Socially he is all that a lawyer and polished gentleman should be. Courtly in manner, pleasant and entertaining in conversation, an enthusiastic and liberal supporter of music and a wide reader, are qualities which combine to endear him to his wide circle of friends.

— Albany Law Journal, 1898

On December 6, 1891, Brendel was married to Augusta Haupt (1865–1951), a daughter of Henrietta (née Fuchs) Haupt and Friedrich Carl Haupt, who had been born in Bad Homburg. Her paternal grandfather, Frederick Albrecht Haupt, was ennobled in 1841 by Louis II, Grand Duke of Hesse, before immigrating to the U.S. in 1857. Together, Henry and Augusta were the parents of two daughters:

- Frieda Henrietta Brendel (1894–1984), who married Arthur James Bulger, son of William J. Bulger, in New York City in 1927. They later divorced and he married Isabel Greunke in 1955.
- Elsa Augusta Brendel (1904–1983), who married Buell Goodsel Tallman II, son of Clarence B. Tallman, in 1926. They separated in 1935, and were divorced in 1937. She later married Lewis C. Conant.

He was a member of the Lutheran St. Stephen's Evangelical Church and the Teutonia Maennerchor singing society.

Brendel died at his home, 526 Linwood Avenue in Buffalo, on September 14, 1940. They also had a summer home in Lake View, New York. His widow died in Buffalo on December 17, 1951. In his will, he left $75,000 in trust for his granddaughter Sally.

=== 1937 attempted kidnaping ===
In 1937, his former son-in-law Buell Goodsel Tallman, attempted to kidnap Brendel's granddaughter from Brendel's home at 526 Linwood Avenue in Buffalo. When his daughter tried to stop her ex-husband from leaving with Sally, he shot and killed Brendel's cook, 60 year-old Louisa Stiehl, before turning the gun on himself and committing suicide in Brendel's home.
