= Senator Wadsworth (disambiguation) =

James Wolcott Wadsworth Jr. (1877–1952) was a U.S. Senator from New York from 1915 to 1927.

Senator Wadsworth may also refer to:

- James Wadsworth (mayor) (1819–1891), New York State Senate
- Peleg Wadsworth (1748–1829), Massachusetts State Senate
- William H. Wadsworth (1821–1893), Kentucky State Senate
