= Warren Bryant =

Warren Bryant may refer to:

- Warren Bryant (American football) (1955–2021), American football player
- Warren Bryant (banker) (1811–1893), American banker
