= Eli Cook =

Eli Cook may refer to:

- Eli Cook (lawyer) (1814–1865), American lawyer and politician
- Eli Cook (musician) (born 1986), American musician
