= Isaac R. Harrington =

American politician and businessman

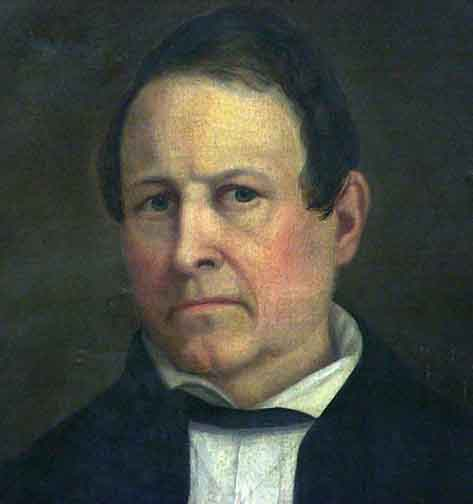
- Buffalo, New York City Hall Portrait Collection

11th Mayor of Buffalo, New York
- In office March 2, 1841 – March 8, 1842
- Preceded by: Sheldon Thompson
- Succeeded by: George W. Clinton

9th Postmaster of Buffalo, New York
- In office May 17, 1849 – August 20, 1851
- Preceded by: Henry K. Smith
- Succeeded by: James O. Putnam

Alderman from Buffalo, New York's Fifth Ward
- In office March 5, 1840 – March 1, 1841 Serving with Peter Curtiss
- Preceded by: Peter Curtiss, Augustine Kimball
- Succeeded by: John R. Lee, Henry Roop

Personal details
- Born: December 7, 1789 New Haven, Connecticut
- Died: August 20, 1851 (aged 61) Buffalo, New York
- Party: Whig
- Spouse: Amanda Lyman (m. 1810-1851, his death)
- Children: 6
- Education: University of Vermont
- Occupation: Businessman; Hotelier

Isaac R. Harrington (December 7, 1789 - August 20, 1851) was a businessman and entrepreneur in Burlington, Vermont and Buffalo, New York. He became active in politics as a Whig and served as mayor of Buffalo from 1841 to 1842.

== Early life ==
Isaac Russell (or Russel) Harrington was born in New Haven, Connecticut on December 7, 1789. (Note: Harrington was most likely born in New Haven, Connecticut. His Vermont birth record indicates he was born in Shelburne, Vermont. Records created during his lifetime, including census entries, indicate he was born in New York. His gravestone was created when his wife was still living, and it indicates New Haven as his birthplace. Since Harrington was born in 1789 and his family moved to Vermont in 1793, it is likely that he was not born in Shelburne. Since town histories for Shelburne indicate his father moved there from Connecticut, a New York birthplace is also not likely. Harrington's wife presumably knew where her husband was born, and would not have made a mistake on the gravestone.) Harrington's mother was Hannah (Upson) Harrington (1763-1840). His father was Benjamin Harrington (1762-1810), a prominent citizen of Shelburne, Vermont, who served several terms in the Vermont House of Representatives. Benjamin Harrington was a native of Connecticut and commanded ships on ocean voyages before moving to Shelburne, which resulted in Shelburne residents frequently referring to him as "Captain Harrington".

In 1793, Benjamin Harrington moved his family to Shelburne, where Isaac Harrington was raised and educated. He graduated from the University of Vermont in 1809. During the War of 1812, Harrington served as a private in the 1st Regiment (Judson's) of the Vermont Militia.

Harrington became active in several business ventures in Burlington, including a store where he sold dry goods, groceries, hardware and housewares. He also bought and sold other items when he had the opportunity, including horses, farms, and barrels of beer. In 1816, Harrington became the proprietor of a Burlington inn and hotel, which he purchased from Joseph King.

Another early Isaac Harrington business venture was operating the Phoenix, a Lake Champlain steamship which made regular trips to and from Whitehall, New York and Saint-Jean-sur-Richelieu, Quebec. Harrington was the ship's sailing master, and as a result was frequently addressed as "Captain Harrington", as his father had been. He left Vermont in about 1830 and moved to Buffalo, New York; an 1832 letter by a Vermonter traveling to Cleveland, Ohio was published in a Burlington newspaper, which indicated that the author had stayed at the Eagle Tavern in Buffalo, of which Harrington was the proprietor.

== Career in Buffalo ==
In addition to Harrington's business career in Buffalo, he became active in the city's local government. In the mid-1830s, he was appointed to several commissions that assessed property owners in order to finance improvements to several Buffalo streets. The owners were required to pay based on the value the improvements would add to their homes and businesses. In Buffalo, Harrington was popularly known as "Cuff" or "Old Cuff", but the origin of the nickname is not known.

Harrington was also involved in Buffalo-area politics as a member of the Whig Party. In 1836 he was a delegate to the party's 8th New York State Senate District Convention. In 1840, Harrington was a candidate for alderman from Buffalo's fifth ward. He was elected, and took his seat in March. Though he was a Whig, in 1841 Harrington entered the race for mayor against the party's preferred candidate, Ira A. Blossom. Harrington was supported by most of Buffalo's Democrats and defeated Blossom. In March, 1841 he succeeded Sheldon Thompson as mayor. He served until March 1842, when he was defeated for reelection by George W. Clinton. Among the initiatives Harrington undertook as mayor was an effort to persuade New York's state government to fund improvements to the Erie Canal, which were intended to ensure that Buffalo-area shipping could continue during periods when the water level of Lake Erie receded.

After leaving the mayor's office, Harrington continued his involvement in Whig politics. He supported Henry Clay for president in 1844, and attended Whig party meetings to organize the Clay campaign in New York. Harrington supported the presidential campaign of Zachary Taylor in the election of 1848. Taylor won and Harrington was one of the honorary managers of a February 1849 Whig inaugural ball held in Buffalo.

Harrington's support for the Whig Party was recognized in May 1849, when he was appointed as postmaster of Buffalo, succeeding Henry K. Smith. He continued to serve in this position until his death, and was succeeded by James O. Putnam. Harrington became ill in the summer of 1851 and died at his home in Buffalo on August 20. He was buried at Forest Lawn Cemetery in Buffalo.

== Electoral history ==
- Election for mayor of Buffalo, 1842

- George W. Clinton, 1462 (61%)
- Isaac R. Harrington, 909 (39%)

- Election for mayor of Buffalo, 1841

- Isaac R. Harrington, 1122 (52%)
- Ira A. Blossom, 996 (48%)

- Election for Alderman from Buffalo's Fifth Ward, 1840

- Isaac R. Harrington, 221 (31.5%)
- Peter Curtiss, 205 (29.2%)
- A. Q. Stebbins, 170 (24.2%)
- Henry Roop, 105 (15.0%)

== Family ==
In 1810, Harrington married Amanda Lyman (1790-1874) in Burlington. They were the parents of six children -- Edmund, Laura, Juliet, Charles, Donald, and Marion.

== Sources ==
=== Internet ===
- "Vermont Vital Records, 1720-1908, Birth Entry for Isaac Russell Harrington". Ancestry.com. Lehi, UT: Ancestry.com, LLC.
- National Archives and Records Administration. "War of 1812 Service Records, 1812-1815, Entry for Isaac R. Harrington". Ancestry.com. Lehi, UT: Ancestry.com, LLC.
- "Vermont Vital Records, 1720-1908, Death Entry for Hannah Harrington". Ancestry.com. Lehi, UT: Ancestry.com, LLC.
- "Service Card, Isaac Harrington". forest-lawn.com. Buffalo, NY: Forest Lawn Cemetery.
- "Vermont Vital Records, 1720-1908, Death Entry for Laura Ann Harrington". Ancestry.com. Lehi, UT: Ancestry.com, LLC.

=== Books ===
- Buffalo Historical Society (1896). Publications of the Buffalo Historical Society. Vol. 4. Buffalo, NY: Bigelow Brothers. p. 300 – via Google Books.
- Goodrich, John Ellsworth (1901). General Catalogue of the University of Vermont. Burlington, VT: Free Press Association. p. 38 – via Internet Archive.
- Harrington, Eugene W. (1907). The Harrington Family in America. Buffalo, NY: Hausauer-Jones Printing Co. p. 107 – via Internet Archive.
- Harrington, George H. (1941). Manuscript of Harrington Family Genealogical Gazetteer. Vol. 1. Austin, TX: G. H. Harrington. p. 43 – via Internet Archive.
- Rann, William S. (1886). History of Chittenden County, Vermont. Syracuse, NY: D. Mason & Co. – via Internet Archive.
- Rizzo, Michael F. (2005). Through the Mayors' Eyes: Buffalo, New York 1832-2005. Morrisville, NC: Lulu Enterprises, Inc. ISBN 978-1-4116-3757-3 – via Google Books.
- Smith, Henry Perry (1884). History of the City of Buffalo and Erie County. Vol. 2. Syracuse, NY: D. Mason & Co. pp. 136-137 – via Internet Archive.
- Welch, Samuel M. (1891). Home History: Recollections of Buffalo During the Decade from 1830 to 1840. Buffalo, NY: Peter Paul & Bro. p. 75 – via Internet Archive.
- Wriston, John C. (1991). Vermont Inns and Taverns, Pre-Revolution to 1925. Rutland, VT: Academy Books. p. 156. ISBN 9780914960751 – via Google Books.

=== Newspapers ===
- "Hymeneal: Isaac R. Harrington and Amanda Lyman". The Sentinel and Democrat. Burlington, VT. March 23, 1810. p. 3 – via Newspapers.com.
- Harrington, I. R. (December 22, 1815). "On Hand at the Brisk Store on the Court House Square". The Sentinel and Democrat. Burlington, VT. p. 3 – via Newspapers.com.
- Harrington, Isaac R. (February 9, 1816). "Removal of the Crockery Store". The Sentinel and Democrat. Burlington, VT. p. 3 – via Newspapers.com.
- Harrington, I. R. (November 21, 1816). "For Sale: One Pair of Good Work Horses". Burlington Gazette. Burlington, VT. p. 4 – via Newspapers.com.
- Harrington, I. R. (March 27, 1818). "To Let: A Small Farm of About 5 Acres". The Sentinel and Democrat. Burlington, VT. p. 3 – via Newspapers.com.
- Harrington, I. R. (November 22, 1822). "Granville Beer". The Sentinel and Democrat. Burlington, VT. p. 3 – via Newspapers.com.
- "New Arrangement: Lake Champlain". The Repertory. St. Albans, VT. August 14, 1828. p. 3 – via Newspapers.com.
- "Letters from the West". The Sentinel and Democrat. Burlington, VT. August 17, 1832. p. 1 – via Newspapers.com.
- "Notice: Franklin Street Commissioners". Buffalo Patriot and Commercial Advertiser. Buffalo, NY. July 29, 1834. p. 4 – via Newspapers.com.
- "Corporation Proceedings". Buffalo Patriot and Commercial Advertiser. Buffalo, NY. May 20, 1835. p. 2 – via Newspapers.com.
- "Whig Senatorial Convention". Daily Commercial Advertiser. Buffalo, NY. September 24, 1836. p. 2 – via Newspapers.com.
- "Whig Nominations". Daily Commercial Advertiser. Buffalo, NY. February 29, 1840. p. 2 – via Newspapers.com.
- "The Charter Election: Fifth Ward". Daily Commercial Advertiser. Buffalo, NY. March 4, 1840. p. 3 – via Newspapers.com.
- "Corporation Proceedings". Daily Commercial Advertiser. Buffalo, NY. March 10, 1840. p. 3 – via Newspapers.com.
- "O. K. Again! Buffalo Charter Election". Spirit of the Age. Woodstock, VT. March 11, 1841. p. 2 – via Newspapers.com.
- "National Fast". Daily Commercial Advertiser. Buffalo, NY. May 12, 1841. p. 2 – via Newspapers.com.
- "Enlargement of the Erie Canal". New-York Tribune. New York, NY. November 19, 1841. p. 1 – via Newspapers.com.
- "Charter Election". Daily Commercial Advertiser. Buffalo, NY. March 2, 1842. p. 2 – via Newspapers.com.
- "Whig Meeting". Buffalo Commercial. Buffalo, NY. January 11, 1844. p. 2 – via Newspapers.com.
- "Grand Inauguration Ball". Morning Express. Buffalo, NY. February 26, 1849. p. 2 – via Newspapers.com.
- "Isaac R. Harrington has been Appointed Post Master at Buffalo". Buffalo Courier. Buffalo, NY. May 19, 1849. p. 3 – via Newspapers.com.
- "Death of Capt. I. R. Harrington". Morning Express. Buffalo, NY. August 21, 1851. p. 2 – via Newspapers.com.
- "Barred by Time". Buffalo Enquirer. Buffalo, NY. September 22, 1894. p. 6 – via Newspapers.com.
- Sheldon, Grace Carew (April 13, 1919). "Isaac R. Harrington, Tenth Mayor of City, Urged Strict Economy". Buffalo Times. Buffalo, NY. p. 26 – via Newspapers.com.
