= Frank W. Standart =

American lawyer and politician (1871–1941)

Member of the New York State Assembly, Erie County, 6th District
- In office January 1, 1905 – December 31, 1905
- Preceded by: George Ruehl
- Succeeded by: James S. Keyes

Personal details
- Born: Frank Wesley Standart; March 20, 1871 Elma, New York
- Died: November 8, 1941 (aged 70) Buffalo, New York
- Party: Republican
- Spouse: Elizabeth J. Charles (m. 1899)
- Children: 4

Frank Wesley Standart (March 20, 1871 – November 8, 1941) was an American lawyer and politician.

== Early life ==
Standart was born on March 20, 1871, in Elma, New York. He was a son of Civil War veteran William Wesley Standart (1835–1907) and Barbara (née Hermann) Standart, who was born in Germany in 1836 and came to this country at the age of sixteen. His father ran a general store in Elma.

His paternal grandparents were War of 1812 veteran William Standart and Olive Morse (née Draper) Standart. He was a great-grandson of Oliver Standart, who was a soldier in the American Revolution, and married Nancy Hancock (niece of signor John Hancock).

He attended the district school until the family moved to Buffalo when he was twelve and entered a high school in 1887, from which he graduated in 1891. He then taught school in Elma for two years.

== Career ==
In 1893, Standart entered the Buffalo Law School while pursuing his legal studies in the office of Howard and Clark before being admitted to the bar in July 1895. In January 1896, Standart became managing clerk in the law office of Henry W. Brendel (who was previously practicing alone after dissolving his partnership with Gen. James Clark Strong). In 1898, Standart became Brendel's partner and in 1906 they added Francis Bagot and styled themselves Brendel, Standart & Bagot.

In 1904, he was elected as a Republican to represent 6th District of Erie County in the New York State Assembly for the 128th New York State Legislature. While in the Assembly, he served on the Judiciary Trades and Manufactures and Revision Committees. His partner, Henry W. Brendel, served as Collector of the Port of Buffalo from 1898 to 1906, afterwards continuing their law practice in Brendel, Standart & Bagot in the Mutual Life Building.

From 1918 to 1934, he served as a City Court Judge.

=== Military service ===
In 1889, Standart enlisted in Company I, 65th Regiment of the National Guard of the State of New York, serving about six years. He was First Sergeant when he was discharged in 1896.

== Personal life ==
On June 28, 1899, Standart was married to Elizabeth J. Charles (1876–1971), a daughter of James T. Charles and Alice (née King) Charles of Buffalo. Together, they were the parents of:

- Helen Olive Standart (1900–1976), who married Henry Stearns Gage in 1928.
- James Wesley Standart (1901–1953)
- Charles Melvin Standart (1902–1979)
- Alice B. Standart (1910–1999)

After being ill for a year, Standart died in Buffalo on November 8, 1941.

New York State Assembly
Preceded by George Ruehl	New York State Assembly; Erie County, 6th District; 1905	Succeeded by James S. Keyes
