= John Benton Callis =

American politician (1828–1898)

John B. Callis
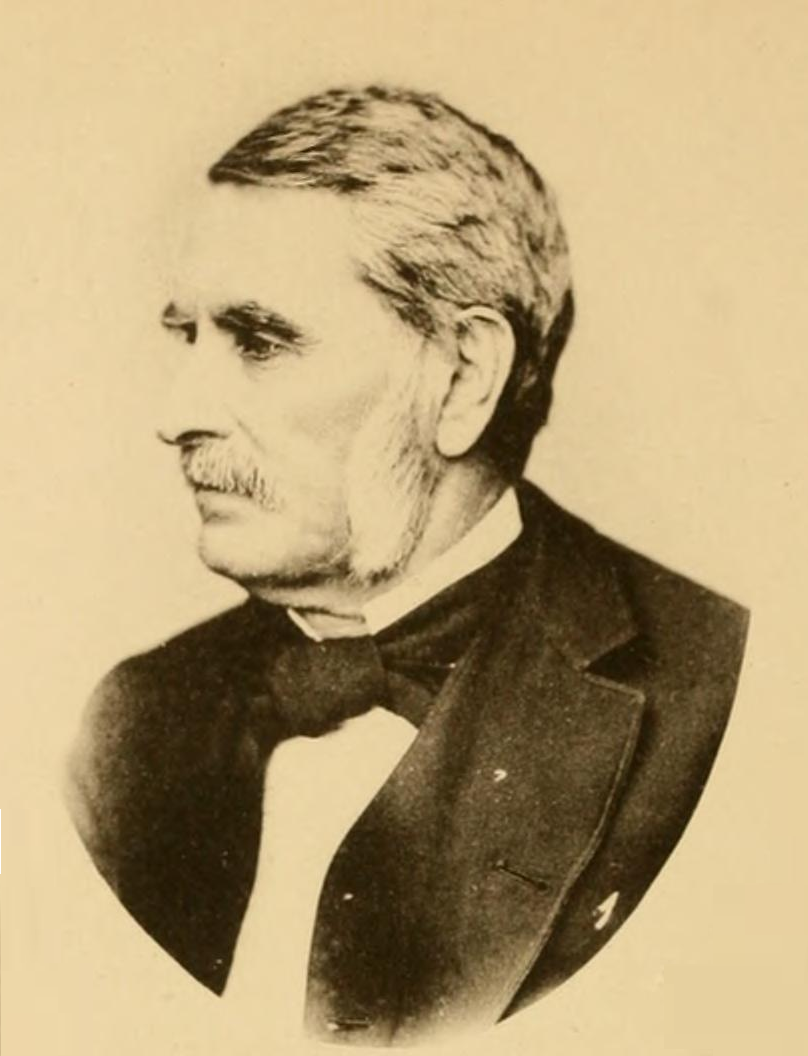
- Callis portrait in Soldiers and Citizens' Album of Biographical Record (1890)

Member of the U.S. House of Representatives from Alabama's 5th district
- In office July 21, 1868 – March 3, 1869
- Preceded by: District inactive
- Succeeded by: Peter Myndert Dox

Member of the Wisconsin State Assembly from the Grant 2nd district
- In office January 5, 1874 – January 4, 1875
- Preceded by: William H. Clise
- Succeeded by: Lafayette Caskey

Personal details
- Born: January 3, 1828 Fayetteville, North Carolina, U.S.
- Died: September 24, 1898 (aged 70) Lancaster, Wisconsin, U.S.
- Resting place: Hillside Cemetery, Lancaster
- Party: Republican; Liberal Republican (1874); Whig (before 1854)
- Spouse: Martha Barnett (m. 1855–1898)
- Children: Frank B. Callis^{(b. 1857; died 1953)}; Jeannette Elizabeth (Meyer)^{(b. 1859; died 1923)}; Jessie B. (McCoy)^{(b. 1862; died 1943)}; Bessie (McCoy)^{(b. 1864; died 1936)}; John Benton Callis Jr.^{(b. 1870; died 1944)}

Military service
- Allegiance: United States
- Branch/service: United States Volunteers; Union Army; United States Army
- Years of service: 1861–1863 (USV); 1864–1865 (VRC); 1865–1868 (USA)
- Rank: Lt. Colonel, USV; Brevet Brig. General, USV; Captain, USA
- Unit: 7th Reg. Wis. Vol. Infantry; 45th Reg. U.S. Infantry
- Battles/wars: American Civil War

John Benton Callis Sr. (January 3, 1828 – September 24, 1898) was an American businessman, politician, and Wisconsin pioneer. He served as a Union Army officer during the American Civil War and was then elected to the 40th U.S. Congress (1868–1869) as a reconstruction-era U.S. representative from Alabama. As a member of Congress, he was the author of the first Ku Klux Klan Act, but his version was defeated in the U.S. Senate.

He later served one term in the Wisconsin State Assembly (1874), representing Grant County, Wisconsin. Politically, Callis spent most of his political career as a member of the Republican Party, but his stint in the Wisconsin State Assembly occurred while he was affiliated with the short-lived Liberal Republican Party, part of Wisconsin's Democratic-backed Reform coalition.

His nephew George Barnett became the 12th Commandant of the United States Marine Corps (1914–1920).

== Early life ==
John Benton Callis was born in Fayetteville, North Carolina, in 1828. As a child, he moved with his parents to Carroll County, Tennessee, where they settled from 1834 to 1840. In 1840, they continued west to the Wisconsin Territory, and settled a homestead in the vicinity of what is now Lancaster, Wisconsin. He attended the common schools around Lancaster, though they were quite primitive in this era.

As a young man, he studied medicine under Dr. J. H. Higgins of Lancaster, but ultimately chose not to pursue that profession. In 1848, he went to Minnesota for work and was employed on the construction of Fort Ripley. After that, he joined the California gold rush in 1851 and engaged in mining and mercantile business. He abandoned the effort in 1853 and returned to Wisconsin by way of Central America. Upon returning to Lancaster, he resumed his mercantile pursuits.

== Civil War service ==
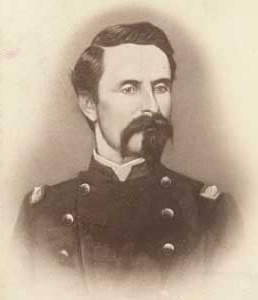
Callis in uniform

At the outbreak of the American Civil War, Callis helped organize a company of volunteers from the Lancaster area, known as the "Lancaster Union Guards". He was initially elected lieutenant of his company, but when it was organized as Company K of the 7th Wisconsin Infantry Regiment, Callis was commissioned as captain of the company.

The 7th Wisconsin Infantry was mustered into federal service on September 2, 1861, and assigned to the brigade of General Rufus King. The 7th Wisconsin was the last to join the brigade in the vicinity of Washington, D.C., joining the 2nd Wisconsin Infantry, the 6th Wisconsin Infantry, and the 19th Indiana Infantry. Their brigade would soon earn fame as the "Iron Brigade of the West" (or the "Iron Brigade of the Army of the Potomac") due to their stoic endurance in their first major battle at Gainesville on August 28, 1862.

Due to the high number of casualties among the regiment's officers from Gainesville, Callis led the 7th Wisconsin Infantry through the battles of the subsequent Maryland campaign, including the Battle of South Mountain and the Battle of Antietam. He was promoted to major on January 5, 1863.

At the Battle of Gettysburg, the Iron Brigade was one of the first units to engage the Confederates on the first day of battle, July 1, 1863. Callis was shot in the chest during that bloody morning of fighting before the Iron Brigade withdrew along with other Union forces to the hills south of the village. Callis laid wounded in the field for three days until the Confederate forces were defeated and forced to withdraw. After a long medical recuperation, he was appointed by President Abraham Lincoln to serve as a military superintendent of the War Department at Washington, D.C. He was promoted to lieutenant colonel February 11, 1865, and was subsequently granted a double brevet to brigadier general of volunteers.

== In Alabama ==
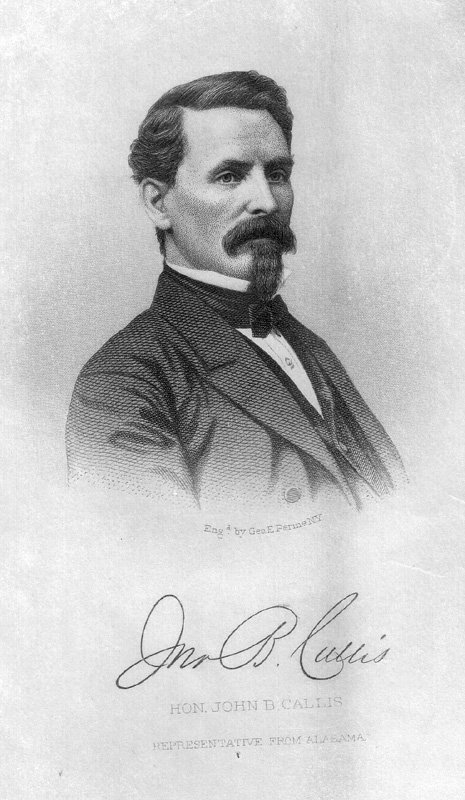
Callis as a congressman

After the war, he was granted a commission as a captain in the regular United States Army and assigned to the 45th U.S. Infantry Regiment. With his regiment, he was assigned to work on reconstruction affairs in Huntsville, Alabama. During his service, he was called to a property where the landowner continued to hold people as slaves and treat them as if slavery were still legal. When Callis saw the man preparing to whip a girl, he stabbed him through the chest. For his act, several citizens of Huntsville presented him with gold watch with an inscribed case, depicting scenes of his act.

He resigned his commission on February 4, 1868, but remained in Alabama. Upon Alabama's readmission to the United States, Callis was elected to the 40th U.S. Congress, representing Alabama's 5th congressional district as a Republican. He served from July 21, 1868, to March 3, 1869, and did not seek re-election. During his brief time in Congress, he was the author of the first Ku Klux Klan Act, which passed the House but was defeated in the United States Senate.

== Return to Wisconsin ==
He returned to Lancaster and engaged in the real-estate business.

He was elected to a single one-year term in the Wisconsin State Assembly in 1874 as part of the short-lived Liberal Reform Party.

He retired from active pursuits, and died in Lancaster on September 24, 1898. He was interred in Hillside Cemetery.

== Personal life and family ==
John Benton Callis was the eldest child of Henry Callis and his wife Christina (née Benton) Callis. Callis had two younger sisters. His nephew, George Barnett, was a career United States Marine Corps officer and became the 12th Commandant of the Marine Corps during the presidency of Woodrow Wilson.

John Benton Callis married Martha "Mattie" Barnett of Brookville, Pennsylvania. They had five children together.

Wisconsin State Assembly
Preceded by William H. Clise	Member of the Wisconsin State Assembly from the Grant 2nd district January 5, 1874 – January 4, 1875	Succeeded by Lafayette Caskey
U.S. House of Representatives
District inactive	Member of the U.S. House of Representatives from Alabama's 5th congressional district July 21, 1868 – March 3, 1869	Succeeded by Peter Myndert Dox
