= James Wadsworth (mayor) =

American politician (1819–1891)

Member of the New York State Senate from the 31st District
- In office January 1, 1856 – August 18, 1858
- Preceded by: James O. Putnam
- Succeeded by: Erastus S. Prosser

21st Mayor of Buffalo
- In office March 4, 1851 – March 9, 1852
- Preceded by: Henry K. Smith
- Succeeded by: Hiram Barton

Personal details
- Born: August 25, 1819 Durham, Connecticut
- Died: May 18, 1891 (aged 71) Yonkers, New York
- Party: Locofocos, Democrat
- Spouses: Rosetta F. Robinson (m. 1845; died 1866) Virginia C. Conklin (m. 1873)
- Children: 6
- Parent(s): Wedworth Wadsworth, Jr. Content Scranton
- Education: Yale College (1841)

James Wadsworth (August 25, 1819 – May 18, 1891) was mayor of the city of Buffalo, New York, serving 1851–1852.

== Early life ==
Wadsworth was born in Durham, Connecticut, on August 25, 1819, to Wedworth Wadsworth, Jr. (1782–1860) and Content (née Scranton) Wadsworth (1783–1839). His elder brothers included Wedworth Wadsworth (1811-1874) and William Wadsworth (c. 1817 – 1870), the Durham Town Clerk and Justice of the Peace. Wadsworth graduated from Yale College in 1841.

=== Family ===
His paternal grandfather, John Noyes Wadsworth II (1758–1814) was the elder brother of William Wadsworth (1765–1833) and James Wadsworth (1768–1844), who settled in and founded Geneseo. Their father, John Noyes Wadsworth (1732–1817) was the younger brother of James Wadsworth (1730–1816), a Brigadier General in the American Revolution and later an anti-Federalist during the ratification of the U.S. Constitution in Connecticut. They were all members of the prominent Wadsworth family of Connecticut, descended from William Wadsworth (1594–1675), one of the Founders of Hartford, Connecticut, who under, the leadership of Pastor Thomas Hooker, helped found that city in June 1636.

== Career ==
After graduating from Yale in 1841, he moved to Buffalo. In 1843, he moved back to New Haven, Connecticut, and for two years studied literature and then law.

In 1845, he returned to Buffalo, and established the law firm of Wadsworth & Cameron. He became involved in real estate and purchased land from Judge Ebenezer Walden. In 1850, he was chosen Buffalo city attorney. On March 4, 1851, was elected as the Locofoco candidate for mayor. During his term, the New York and Erie Railroad was completed from New York to Dunkirk and the Buffalo Female Academy opened. His term as mayor ended on March 9, 1852.

In 1851, Wadsworth became president of the Buffalo, Brantford and Goderich Railroad and continued this after his mayoral term ended. He was a Democratic member of the New York State Senate (31st D.) from 1856 to 1858, sitting in the 79th, 80th and 81st New York State Legislatures. He resigned his seat on August 18, 1858.

=== Later career ===
In 1859, he removed to New York City, and for the next 25 years he was engaged in "various railway, mining, and oil companies." He worked for Wells & Fargo's Overland Express, and practiced law part of the time. He also served as chairman of the Loyal League of Union Citizens during the U.S. Civil War.

== Personal life ==
On September 8, 1845, he married Rosetta F. Robinson. Together, they were the parents of six children, including:

- Wedworth Wadsworth (1846–1926), a painter and author.
- Augustus Henry Wadsworth (1850–1861)
- Rose Frances Wadsworth (1856–1939)
- Hannah Wadsworth (b. 1856)
- James Wadsworth, Jr. (b. 1860)

After her death in 1866, he remarried to Virginia C. Conklin of Norfolk, Virginia, on July 9, 1873. Around 1889, he was placed in an institution in Yonkers, New York, where died May 18, 1891, and was buried at Durham, Connecticut.

Political offices
Preceded by Henry K. Smith	Mayor of Buffalo, NY; 1851–1852	Succeeded by Hiram Barton
New York State Senate
Preceded by James O. Putnam	New York State Senate; 31st District; 1856–1858	Succeeded by Erastus S. Prosser
