= Hiram Barton =

American politician (1810–1880)

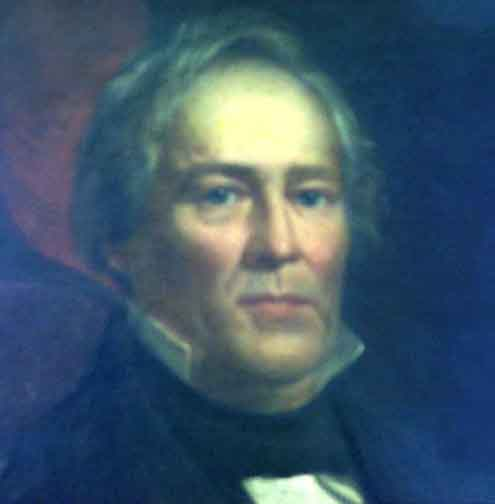
- Portrait of Hiram Barton

19th and 22nd Mayor of Buffalo
- In office 1849–1850, 1852–1853
- Preceded by: Orlando Allen; Henry K. Smith
- Succeeded by: James Wadsworth; Eli Cook

Personal details
- Born: May 20, 1810 Hebron, New York
- Died: February 10, 1880 (aged 69) Buffalo, New York
- Party: Whig
- Spouse: Lucy Ann Clark
- Children: 2

Hiram K. Barton (1810–1880) was mayor of the city of Buffalo, New York, serving 1849–1850 and 1852–1853. He was born in Hebron, New York on May 20, 1810. He attended Middlebury College in Vermont, where he studied law. He moved to Buffalo in 1835 and formed a law partnership. In 1840, he married Lucy Ann Clark of Buffalo.

In 1843 Barton was elected alderman of the Third Ward, and again in 1844. He was elected as the Whig choice for Mayor on March 7, 1849. During his first term, cholera returned to the city and nearly ten percent of the population was stricken and three per cent died within a period of four and a half months. The city charter was changed to make the term of elected aldermen to two years instead of one. He did not seek a second term in 1850. He was elected on March 2, 1852, to his second term; the last time the Whigs triumphed in Buffalo. His second term ended on March 8, 1853.

He resumed his law practice until about 1875, when he retired. Barton died on February 10, 1880, and was buried in Forest Lawn Cemetery.

Hiram's wife, Lucy, died at her home in Franklin Street, Buffalo on 10 June 1881.

Political offices
Preceded by Orlando Allen	Mayor of Buffalo, NY; 1849–1850	Succeeded by Henry K. Smith
Preceded by James Wadsworth	Mayor of Buffalo, NY; 1852–1853	Succeeded by Eli Cook
