= Buffalo North Breakwater South End Light =

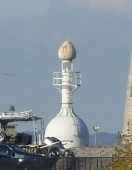
- Buffalo North Breakwater South End Light, October 2008
- Location: Buffalo Harbor, Buffalo, New York
- Coordinates: 42°52′49″N 78°53′45″W

Tower
- Constructed: 1903
- Foundation: Concrete base on pier
- Construction: Boiler plate
- Automated: 1960
- Height: 29 feet (8.8 m)
- Shape: Bottle
- Heritage: National Register of Historic Places listed place

Light
- First lit: 1903
- Deactivated: 1985
- Buffalo North Breakwater South End Light
- U.S. National Register of Historic Places
- MPS: U.S. Coast Guard Lighthouses and Light Stations on the Great Lakes TR
- NRHP reference No.: 83001669
- Added to NRHP: August 4, 1983

Buffalo North Breakwater South End Light is a lighthouse formerly located at the entrance to Buffalo Harbor, Buffalo, New York, United States. It is one of two "bottle shaped" beacons located in Buffalo Harbor; the other is the South Buffalo North Side Light. It is a 29-foot (8.8 m) high beacon constructed of boiler plate. It measures 10 feet 3/4 inch (3.067 m) at the bottom and 2 feet 3 inches (0.69 m) at the top. It is distinguished by four cast iron port windows and a curved iron door. It was first lit on September 1, 1903, and originally equipped with a 6th-order Fresnel lens. A battery operated 12 volt lamp with a 12 inches (300 mm) green plastic lens was installed in the beacon c. 1960, when a domed roof formerly mounted over the lens was removed. The beacon was removed in 1985, and now stands on the grounds of the Buffalo (main) Light. Its twin is located at the Dunkirk Lighthouse and Veterans Park Museum.

It was listed on the National Register of Historic Places in 1983.
