= Sheldon Thompson =

American politician

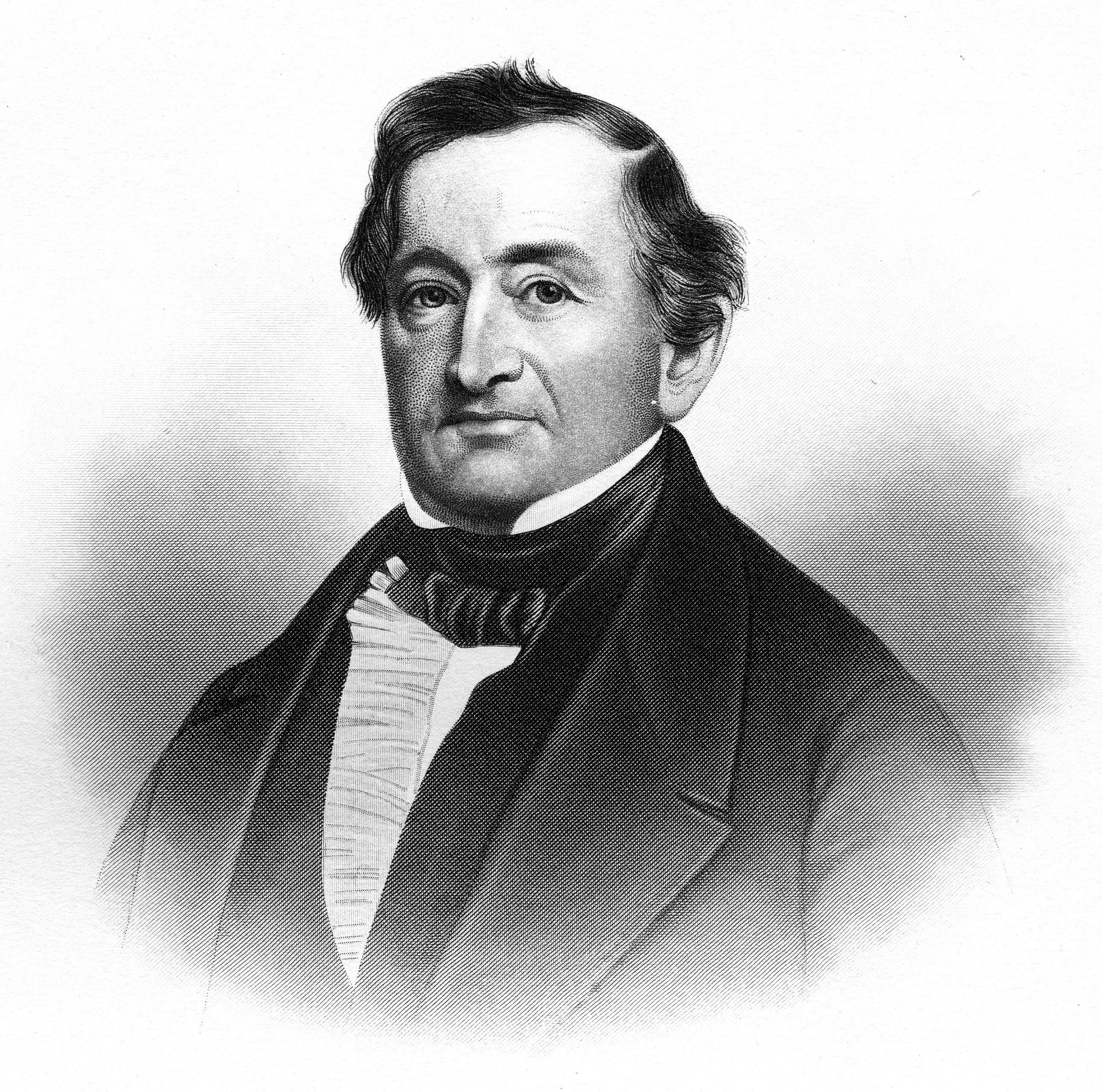

10th Mayor of Buffalo
- In office 1840–1841
- Preceded by: Hiram Pratt
- Succeeded by: Isaac R. Harrington

Personal details
- Born: July 2, 1785 Derby, Connecticut, U.S.
- Died: March 13, 1851 (aged 65) Buffalo, New York, U.S.
- Party: Whig
- Spouse: Catharine Barton
- Children: 10

Sheldon Thompson (July 2, 1785– March 13, 1851) was mayor of Buffalo, New York, serving in 1840–1841. He was born in Derby, Connecticut, on July 2, 1785. At age 10, he went to sea as a cabin boy, under his brother, William, then master. In 1798, during the Quasi-War, he was taken prison in the West Indies and shipped to Guadeloupe for several months. He continued at sea until he became master of the ship Keziah, owned by Gillet & Townsend of New Haven, having risen to command a West Indies trade ship by twenty-four years old.

In early 1810, he moved to Lewiston, New York, where he entered into the shipbuilding business and mercantile trade along the Great Lakes with Senior Partner, Jacob Townsend and Alvin Bronson, the latter of which would go on to be the first mayor of Oswego, New York. They constructed the Catherine and the Charles and Ann, two schooners used as gunboats during the War of 1812.

He also entered the salt trade from the Onondaga salt mines. In April 1811, he married Catharine Barton, for whom he named the schooner. His daughter Sally Ann married Henry K. Smith a future mayor of the city. Around 1816 or 1817, Thompson moved to Black Rock, and promoted the village which was in direct competition with Buffalo for the western terminus of the Erie Canal. By 1830, Thompson moved to Buffalo and became a principal freight forwarder.

On March 8, 1840, Thompson became the first mayor elected by the people, defeating Democrat George P. Barker 1,135 to 1,125. In 1845, he retired from active business life and occupied himself with the management of his estate. He died in Buffalo on March 13, 1851, and is buried in Forest Lawn Cemetery.

Political offices
Preceded by Ebenezer Walden	Mayor of Buffalo, NY; 1840–1841	Succeeded by Isaac R. Harrington
