= George W. Clinton =

American politician and lawyer (1807–1885)

George William Clinton
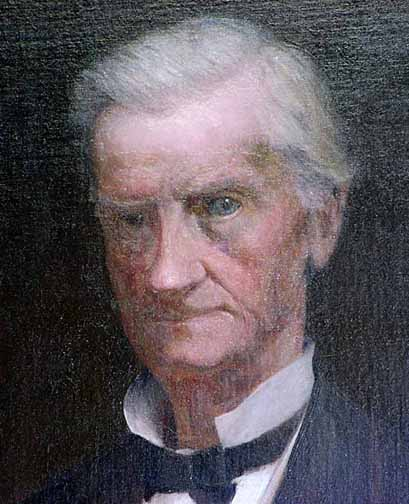
- Portrait of George W. Clinton

7th United States Attorney for the Northern District of New York
- In office 1847–1850
- Appointed by: James K. Polk
- Preceded by: William F. Allen
- Succeeded by: James R. Lawrence

12th Mayor of Buffalo
- In office March 8, 1842 – March 14, 1843
- Preceded by: Isaac R. Harrington
- Succeeded by: Joseph G. Masten

Collector of the Port of Buffalo
- In office 1838–1842
- Appointed by: Martin Van Buren
- Preceded by: Pierre A. Barker
- Succeeded by: Jedediah Hyde Lathrop

Personal details
- Born: April 21, 1807 New York City
- Died: September 7, 1885 (aged 78) Menands, New York
- Party: Democratic
- Spouse: Laura Catherine Spencer (m. 1832)
- Children: 9
- Parent: DeWitt Clinton (father)
- Education: The Albany Academy
- Alma mater: Hamilton College (1825); Norwich University (1827); Litchfield Law School (1828)

George William Clinton (April 21, 1807 – September 7, 1885) was an American lawyer, politician, judge, writer, and amateur naturalist. He served as mayor of Buffalo, New York from 1842 to 1843.

== Early life and family ==
Clinton was born on April 21, 1807, in New York City to Maria Franklin (1775–1818) and DeWitt Clinton (1769–1828), while the latter was serving as Mayor of New York City. His father later became a U.S. Senator and the 6th Governor of New York. He was the grandson of Major General James Clinton (1736–1812), grandnephew of George Clinton (1739–1812), the 4th U.S. Vice President, nephew of George Clinton, Jr. (1771–1809), a U.S. Representative, and James G. Clinton (1804–1849), also a member of the House of Representatives.

=== Education ===
Clinton grew up in Albany, New York, and attended The Albany Academy. He graduated from Hamilton College in 1825 and Norwich University in 1827, and was a member of Phi Beta Kappa. In 1828, he attended the Litchfield Law School, completed his legal studies with Judge Ambrose Spencer (1765–1848), and was admitted to the bar in 1831.

== Career ==
Clinton initially practiced law in Albany with Matthew H. Webster and then in 1832 formed a partnership with the son of his legal mentor, John Canfield Spencer (1788–1855), who eventually became the 17th United States Secretary of War and 16th United States Secretary of the Treasury in Canandaigua, New York. He served as the District Attorney of Ontario County from 1835 to 1836.

In 1836, he moved to Buffalo and settled on the north side of East Mohawk Street between Washington and Ellicott Streets. The same year he organized the local Democratic Party with 20 or so other citizens.

=== Political career ===
On March 22, 1838, he was appointed Collector of Customs at Buffalo by U.S. President Martin Van Buren. Clinton served in this role until 1842 when he was succeeded by Jedediah Hyde Lathrop. In March of that same year, Clinton was elected Mayor of Buffalo. Although a Democrat, his election was unique in that he was not a party candidate. During his term the City Charter was revised. On March 14, 1843, he presided over his last council meeting.

Clinton was appointed as United States Attorney for the Northern District of New York under President James K. Polk, and served from 1847 to 1850. From 1854 to 1878 he was Judge of Buffalo's Superior Court. His legal writings included the three volume Digest of the Decisions of the Law and Equity Courts of the State of New York and Phi Beta Kappa oration Union College in 1857. In 1867, he was a delegate to the New York State Constitutional Convention.

=== Later career ===
In 1856, he was appointed a Regent of the University of the State of New York. He served until his death, and attained the position of Vice Chancellor of the board.

In 1882, he moved to Albany to become editor of the Clinton Papers, a collection left by his granduncle George Clinton. Clinton was one of the organizers of the Buffalo Society of Natural Sciences, founded on December 5, 1861. He was chosen its first president, and served for 20 years in that role. He was an amateur naturalist, and published 1882's Catalogue of the Native and Naturalized Plants of the City of Buffalo and its Vicinity.

== Personal life ==
On May 15, 1832, he married Laura Catherine Spencer (1810–1891), the daughter of John Canfield Spencer, his former law partner. Their children included:

- De Witt Clinton (1833–1873)
- Charles Clinton
- Elizabeth Spencer Clinton (1835–1918), who married Henry L. Clinton (1820–1899), a prominent New York lawyer.
- Spencer Clinton (1839–1914), an attorney in Buffalo, who married Sarah Riley (1851–1880), daughter of William A. Riley and Frances A. Stillman, in 1870. After her death, he married her sister, Carrie Riley (1859–1887), and in 1895, he married a third time to Cora Caldwell (1870–1925).
- Catharine Clinton (1841–1881), who married Albert J. Wheeler (1841–1924), president of the Western Savings Bank and Wheeler-Monarch Elevator Company.
- Minnie Natalie Clinton, who married Abram H. Baldwin
- George Clinton (1846–1934), an attorney in Buffalo, married Alice Thornton (1847–1931), daughter of Thomas F. Thornton and Jane Parker.

He died on September 7, 1885, while walking through Albany Rural Cemetery in Menands. He was laid to rest in Forest Lawn Cemetery after a service at St. Paul's Cathedral, still clutching the clover he was holding when he died.

=== Honors ===
In 1864, Clinton was awarded the honorary degree of LL.D. by Hamilton College.

Political offices
| Preceded by William F. Allen | United States Attorney for the Northern District of New York; 1847-1850 | Succeeded by James R. Lawrence |
Political offices
| Preceded by Isaac R. Harrington | Mayor of Buffalo, NY; 1842–1843 | Succeeded by Joseph G. Masten |
