= John Henry Caldwell =

American politician (1826–1902)

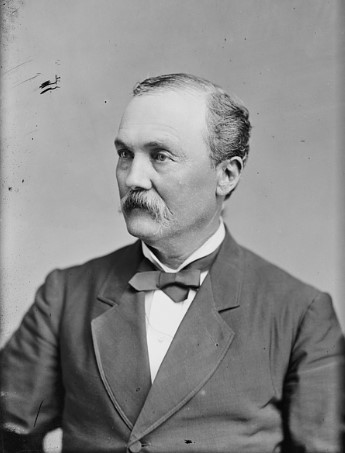

Member of the U.S. House of Representatives from Alabama's 5th district
- In office March 4, 1873 – March 3, 1877
- Preceded by: Peter M. Dox
- Succeeded by: Robert F. Ligon

Member of the Alabama House of Representatives
- In office 1857-1858

Personal details
- Born: John Henry Caldwell; April 4, 1826 Huntsville, Alabama
- Died: September 4, 1902 (aged 76) Jacksonville, Alabama
- Party: Democratic

John Henry Caldwell (April 4, 1826 – September 4, 1902) was a U.S. representative from Alabama.

== Early life and education ==
Born in Huntsville, Alabama, Caldwell attended the common schools of Huntsville and Bacon College, Harrodsburg, Kentucky.

== Teaching career ==
He taught school in Limestone County, Alabama, four years. He moved to Jacksonville, Alabama, in 1848. He was principal of the Jacksonville Female Academy 1848-1852 and of the Jacksonville Male Academy 1853-1857. Caldwell edited the Jacksonville Republican in 1851 and 1852 and assumed the editorship of the Sunny South in 1855. He served as member of the State house of representatives in 1857 and 1858.

== Legal career ==
He studied law. He was admitted to the bar in 1859 and commenced practice in Jacksonville, Alabama.

== American Civil War ==
During the Civil War enlisted in the Confederate States Army and organized Company A of the Tenth Alabama Regiment, from St. Clair and Calhoun Counties, and served throughout the war. He was promoted to major and then to lieutenant colonel. He served in the Army of Virginia.

== Political career ==
Caldwell was elected solicitor for the tenth judicial circuit in 1863 but was deposed by the Provisional Governor in 1865. He was reelected the same year, and in 1867 was removed from office for refusing to obey military orders.

Caldwell was first elected to congress on November 5, 1872 as a fusion candidate of the Liberal Republican and Democratic parties. He received 62.62% of the vote. He was elected to represent Alabama's 5th congressional district, which at the time encompassed the most north-eastern part of Alabama.

He was re-elected in 1874 as a straight Democrat with 59.19% of the vote. Caldwell was a member of the Forty-third and Forty-fourth Congresses (March 4, 1873 – March 3, 1877). He served as chairman of the Committee on Agriculture (Forty-fourth Congress). He was not a candidate for renomination in 1876.

== Later life and death ==
He resumed the practice of law. He died in Jacksonville, Alabama, September 4, 1902. He was interred in Jacksonville Cemetery.

U.S. House of Representatives
Preceded by Peter M. Dox	Member of the U.S. House of Representatives from Alabama's 5th congressional district 1873-1877	Succeeded by Robert F. Ligon
