= Orlando Allen =

American politician (1803–1874)

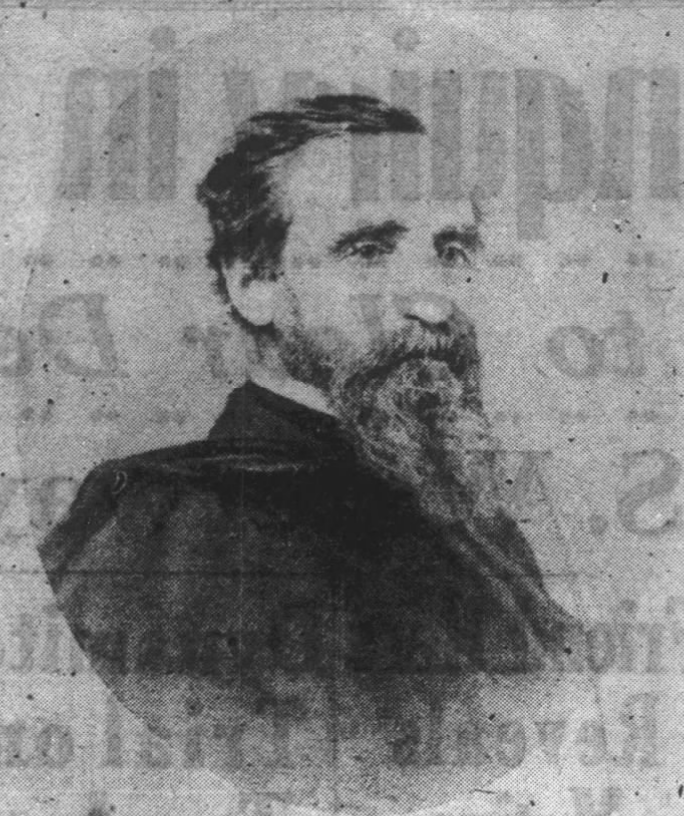
- Allen during his mayoralty

18th Mayor of Buffalo
- In office 1848–1849
- Preceded by: Elbridge G. Spaulding
- Succeeded by: Hiram Barton

Member of the New York State Assembly from the Erie County, 1st district
- In office January 1, 1860 – December 31, 1860
- Preceded by: Daniel Bowen
- Succeeded by: Stephen V. R. Watson

Member of the New York State Assembly from the Erie County, 1st district
- In office January 1, 1850 – December 31, 1851
- Preceded by: Benoni Thompson
- Succeeded by: Israel T. Hatch

Personal details
- Born: January 10, 1803 New Hartford, Connecticut
- Died: September 4, 1874 (aged 71) Buffalo, New York
- Party: Whig
- Spouse: Marilla A. Pratt
- Children: 6

Orlando Allen (1803–1874) was a member of the New York State Assembly and the 18th mayor of the City of Buffalo, New York. Allen began his political career as city treasurer, followed by two separate terms as Second Ward Alderman. He served an extended single term as mayor after being appointed in January 1848. He was elected to a full term in March of that year, and served until the term expired in 1849, when he declined to run for a second term. He was a member of the State Assembly in 1850 and 1851. He later served on the Buffalo Board of Supervisors, representing the Second Ward in 1856–1857, before winning one final term in the State Assembly in 1860. He ran for most of his offices as a Whig, however, after the collapse of that party, he served his final term in the Assembly as a Republican.

Political offices
Preceded by Elbridge G. Spaulding	Mayor of Buffalo, NY; 1848–1849	Succeeded by Hiram Barton
