= Samuel P. Capen =

American educational administrator (1878-1956)

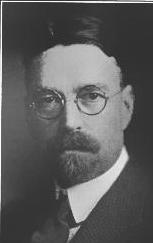

7th Chancellor of the University at Buffalo
- In office 1922–1950
- Preceded by: Charles Phelps Norton
- Succeeded by: T. R. McConnell

Personal details
- Born: March 21, 1878
- Died: June 22, 1956 (aged 78)
- Education: Tufts University (B.A., M.A.); Harvard University (M.A.); University of Pennsylvania (Ph.D.)

Samuel Paul Capen (March 21, 1878 – June 22, 1956) was an American educational administrator. He served as president of the American Council on Education and as chief of the higher education branch of the Office of Education before becoming the first salaried, full-time chancellor at the University at Buffalo. Capen led the university between 1922 and 1950.

== Early life and career ==
Capen was the son of Elmer Hewitt Capen, the third president of Tufts College. He completed undergraduate studies and an M.A. at Tufts. While at Tufts, Capen was class president, vice-president of the school's publishing association, a fraternity member and an assistant manager for the football team. He earned a second M.A. at Harvard University and a Ph.D. at the University of Pennsylvania. During his doctoral studies, he took a one-year leave from Penn to study at the University of Leipzig.

During his early academic career, Capen taught German at Clark College. Capen was a higher education specialist for the U.S. Bureau of Education between 1914 and 1919. He served as president of the alumni association at Tufts between 1914 and 1916. Between 1919 and 1922, Capen served as the first director of the American Council on Education. He was installed as chancellor of the University at Buffalo on October 28, 1922.

Capen took the position at Buffalo less than two years after the school had completed a $5,000,000 endowment campaign. Capen was its first salaried and full-time chancellor. Upon his installment, Capen was looked upon as a nationally known education expert. At his presidential inauguration, Capen expressed his philosophy of equal access to education. "I do not hold with those who would limit the number of college students on the basis of any distinctions of race or sex or creed or social standing. There is but one justifiable basis on which a university in a democratic community such as this can choose those who are to become members of it, the basis of ability," he said.

At that time that Capen took the position at Buffalo, news sources noted his comments on the state of American colleges. Capen said that most colleges were overcrowded and that they were largely doing the teaching that should have taken place in high schools. Tufts named Capen a life trustee in 1931. Capen delivered a 1939 speech, "Seven Devils in Exchange for One", in which he criticized regional education accreditation agencies. He said that the agencies were too numerous and that they often cost schools money because they evaluated based on things other than intellectual quality. In planning for the use of education in World War II, Capen was critical of the way that educated men had been drafted into military assignments during World War I, which he said made little use of their individual intellects.

Capen died in 1956 after a lengthy illness.

== Personal ==
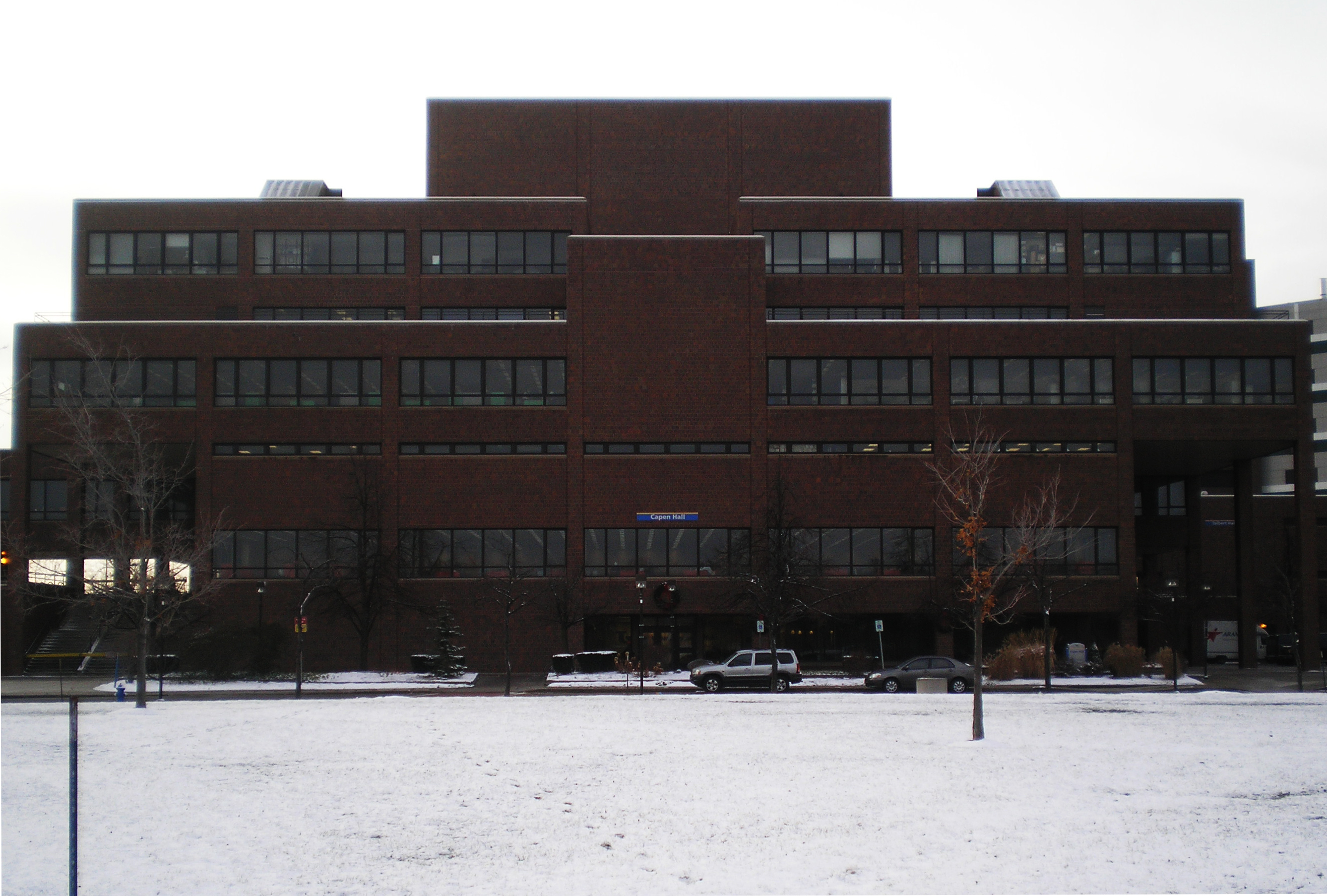
Capen Hall, University at Buffalo

Capen married Grace Duncan Wright. She was the daughter of Carroll D. Wright, the first president of Clark College. Grace Wright was the 1929-1930 president of a Buffalo women's social club known as the Twentieth Century Club.

In 1934, Capen was one of three founders of the Buffalo Philharmonic Orchestra.

== Later life and legacy ==
The University at Buffalo honored Capen with the dedication of a campus building, Capen Hall. The university has established the Samuel P. Capen Chair of Poetry and the Humanities. The Samuel P. Capen Garden Walk is an annual guided tour of private gardens that surround the university's campus.

== Works ==
- Capen, Samuel P. The Management of Universities. Foster & Stewart Publishing Corporation, 1953
