= Josiah Trowbridge =

American politician (1785–1962)

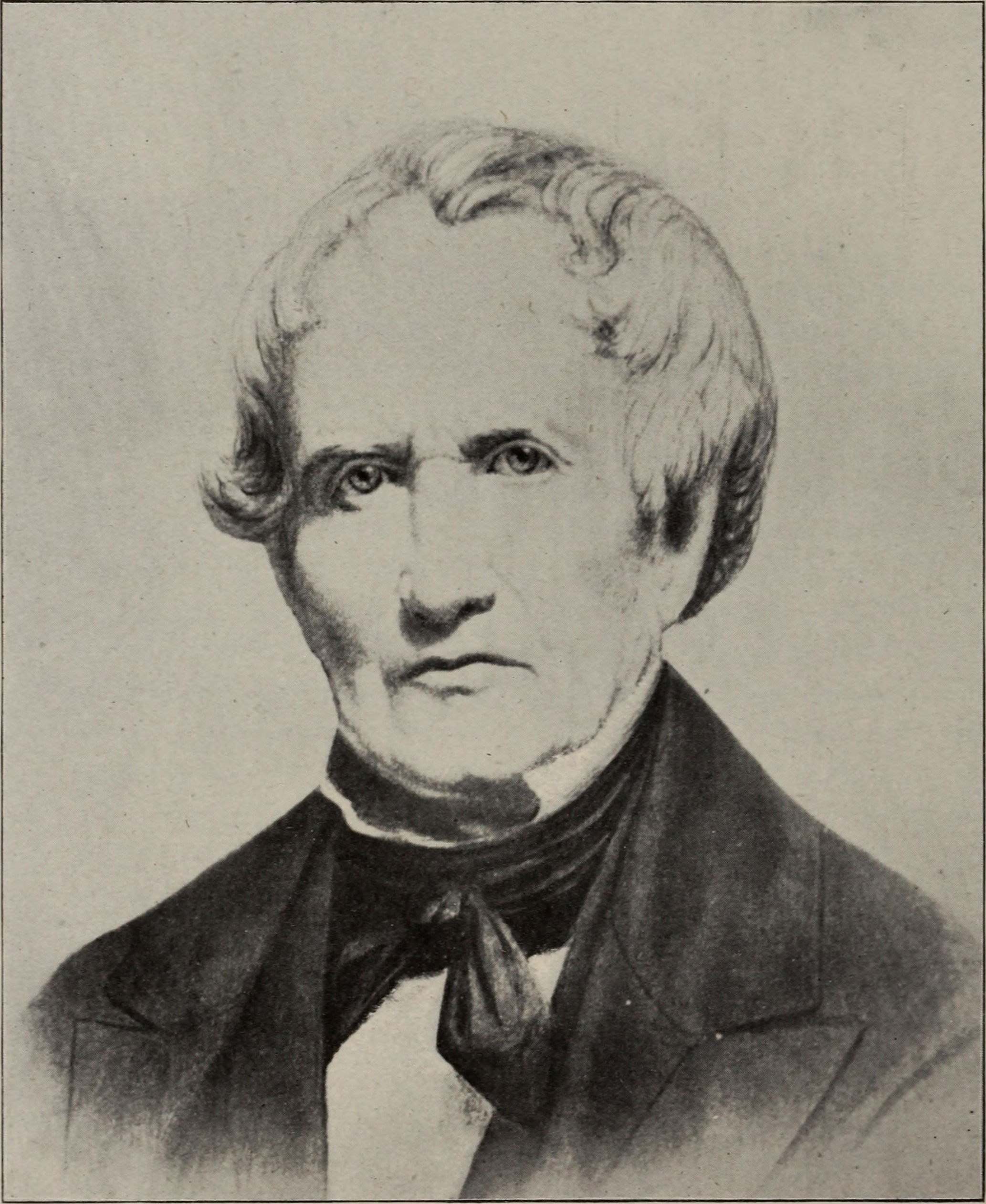

6th Mayor of Buffalo
- In office March 14, 1837 – December 21, 1837
- Preceded by: Samuel Wilkeson
- Succeeded by: Pierre A. Barker

Personal details
- Born: September 29, 1785 Framingham, Massachusetts
- Died: September 13, 1862 (aged 76) Buffalo, New York
- Party: Whig
- Spouse: Margaret Wintermute
- Children: eleven children
- "Josiah Trowbridge". Through The Mayor's Eyes, The Only Complete History of the Mayor's of Buffalo, New York, Compiled by Michael Rizzo. The Buffalonian is produced by The Peoples History Union. May 27, 2009.

Josiah Trowbridge (1785–1862) was mayor of Buffalo, New York, serving in 1837. He was born in Framingham, Massachusetts on September 29, 1785. In 1808 or 1809, he was licensed to practice as a medical doctor and began work in Weathersfield, Vermont. He arrived at Buffalo in 1811. During the War of 1812, he joined the Buffalo Light Artillery Company and tended to the wounded during the first assault on Black Rock and during the burning of the village on December 31, 1813, Trowbridge was one of the last to leave, helping to secure the safety of the women and children. On September 22, 1813, he married Margaret Wintermute of Fort Erie, Ontario. He was among the many of Buffalo's early pioneers who suffered from the economic collapse of 1836—1837, and from the speculation of Benjamin Rathbun.

In 1816, he was elected as the first Treasurer of the Village of Buffalo, then elected Supervisor of Buffalo in 1823, 1825, and 1827. He was elected mayor by the Common council and accepted the office of Mayor on March 14, 1837. During his term, several new positions with the city were created, including superintendent of schools and the office of police justice. Also during his short term, the Canadian Rebellions, or "Patriot War" resulted in so much unrest in the city that it was becoming difficult to keep order. On June 17, 1837 he took a leave of absence and resigned as mayor on December 21, 1837. The council appointed Alderman Pierre A. Barker as mayor pro tem.

Trowbridge resumed his medical practice and was actively engaged in his profession for 50 years. In 1839 he was president, and from 1843 to 1853, librarian, of the Erie County Medical Society and, in 1845, served as the first president of the Buffalo Medical Association. In 1847, was elected the first President of the Buffalo General Hospital and was on the medical board of the Buffalo Hospital of the Sisters of Charity. He died September 13, 1862, and was buried from St. Paul's Cathedral to Forest Lawn Cemetery.

Political offices
Preceded by Samuel Wilkeson	Mayor of Buffalo, NY; 1837	Succeeded by Pierre A. Barker
