= Pierre A. Barker =

American politician (1790–1870)

7th Mayor of Buffalo
- In office December 21, 1837 – 1838
- Preceded by: Josiah Trowbridge
- Succeeded by: Ebenezer Walden

Collector of the Port of Buffalo
- In office 1829–1838
- Appointed by: Andrew Jackson
- Preceded by: Myndert M. Dox
- Succeeded by: George W. Clinton

Personal details
- Born: Pierre Augustus Barker; April 17, 1790 LaGrange, New York
- Died: January 4, 1870 (aged 79) Natchez, Mississippi
- Spouse: Annache G. Livingston
- Children: 8

Pierre Augustus Barker (April 17, 1790 – January 4, 1870) was an American mayor of Buffalo, New York, serving in 1837–1838.

== Early life ==
He was born in LaGrange, New York, on April 17, 1790. He was a son of Samuel Still Augustus Barker (1756–1819) and Mariah (née Delevan) Barker.

His paternal grandparents were Esther and Samuel Barker, a Brigade Major in the 2nd Connecticut during the Revolutionary War.

== Career ==
He arrived in Buffalo in c. 1829 and, a wealthy man, purchased many properties in and around the village. Shortly after his arrival he was appointed collector of customs for the port of Buffalo, and held the position from 1829 to 1838. He was one of the founders of the first Bank of Buffalo in 1831. He served as president of the Commercial bank in 1835 or 1836. The Commercial Bank was incorporated in Upper Canada on January 28, 1831.

In 1838 or 1840, Barker was president of the United States Bank at Buffalo. In 1837, Barker held the office of Alderman for the 5th ward and lived in a mansion on Hudson Street. He was selected as acting mayor on December 21, 1837, after Josiah Trowbridge resigned. He immediately took to trying to calm the unrest in the city due to the Canadian Rebellions, or "Patriot War". His term ended in 1838 and sometime after 1841 Barker left Buffalo and moved to Natchez, Mississippi.

== Personal life ==
In 1812 he married Annache Gilbert Livingston (b. 1790). Together, they were the parents of eight children, including:

- Eugenia Marie Barker, who married Philander Hodge.
- Elizabeth King Barker (1823–1905), who married John Johnson.

Barker died on January 4, 1870, in Natchez, Mississippi.

Government offices
Preceded by Myndert M. Dox	Collector of the Port of Buffalo; 1829–1838	Succeeded by George W. Clinton
Political offices
Preceded by Josiah Trowbridge	Mayor of Buffalo, NY; 1837–1838	Succeeded by Ebenezer Walden
