= Myndert M. Dox =

American soldier and government official

Captain Myndert M. Dox

Collector of the Port of Buffalo
- In office 1822–1829
- Appointed by: James Monroe
- Preceded by: Oliver Forward
- Succeeded by: Pierre A. Barker

Personal details
- Born: Myndert Marselis Dox; January 6, 1790 Albany, New York
- Died: September 8, 1830 (aged 40) Buffalo, New York
- Relations: Gerrit L. Dox (brother); Peter Myndert Dox (nephew)
- Parent(s): Pieter Dox; Catalyntje Lansing

Captain Myndert Marselis Dox (January 6, 1790 – September 8, 1830) was a soldier and government official in Western New York.

== Early life ==
Dox was born on January 6, 1790, in Albany, New York and was baptized in the Albany Dutch Reformed Church on January 17, 1790. He was a son of Catalyntje Lansing and merchant and skipper Pieter Dox, who served in the French and Indian War and the Revolutionary War. His brother, Peter P. Dox, was Postmaster of Albany from 1814 until his death in November 1815 when he was succeeded by another brother, Gerrit Lansing Dox in January 1816, who later served as New York State Treasurer from February 1817 to January 1821. Through his brother Abraham, he was uncle to Peter Myndert Dox, who represented Alabama in the U.S. House of Representatives between 1869 and 1873.

His paternal grandparents were Abraham Dox and Rebecca (née Marselis) Dox (a daughter of his namesake Myndert Marselis). His maternal grandparents were Gerrit Lansing Jr. and his second wife, the former Wyntie (née Vandenbergh) Lansing.

== Career ==
Dox relocated to Geneva, New York and during the War of 1812, served as a captain in the Thirteenth Regiment of Infantry from 1812 to 1815. In 1817, Dox was elected to represent Seneca County in the New York State Assembly for the 41st New York State Legislature. He claimed his seat, but was not admitted. However, he was paid like a member until the final rejection of his claim. John Sutton was returned as elected from both Seneca Co. and Tompkins Co. which gave Dox a strong argument to pursue his claim vigorously, but without success. It was reported that Dox "declined to take the oath prescribed by the law to prevent dueling, on account, it is said, of conscientious scruples which he entertained."

In 1822, President James Monroe appointed Dox to replace Collector of the Port of Buffalo Oliver Forward. President John Quincy Adams wrote of Dox in his diary on March 24, 1828, claiming that Stephen Pleasonton, Auditor of the U.S. Treasury Department, had supplied him with letters and depositions asserting that Dox embezzled $4,000 intended for the construction of a light house on the Buffalo harbor. Nevertheless, he remained in his post and was succeeded by Andrew Jackson's appointee Pierre A. Barker in 1829.

== Personal life ==
Dox died, unmarried, in Buffalo on September 8, 1830.

Government offices
Preceded by Oliver Forward	Collector of the Port of New York; 1822–1829	Succeeded by Pierre A. Barker
