= John T. Hudson =

American politician

Collector of the Port of Buffalo
- In office 1854–1858
- Appointed by: Franklin Pierce
- Preceded by: William Ketchum
- Succeeded by: Warren Bryant

Personal details
- Born: June 7, 1810 Schenectady, New York
- Died: April 16, 1887 (aged 76) Buffalo, New York
- Spouse: Gertrude Craig
- Children: Archibald Craig Hudson

John T. Hudson (June 7, 1810 – April 16, 1887) was an American lawyer and politician from New York.

== Early life ==
Hudson was born on June 7, 1810, in Schenectady, New York.

== Career ==
Hudson lived in Buffalo, New York, and became a lawyer, and "a man of large wealth." From 1832 to 1836, he formed a law partnership with George P. Barker, later the New York State Attorney General.

In November 1846, he was elected on the Democratic and Anti-Rent tickets a canal commissioners. Under the Act of May 6, 1844, there were two canal commissioners to be elected to a four-year term beginning on February 1, 1847, but at the same State election the voters ratified the New York State Constitution of 1846 which extended the terms of the incumbent commissioners until the end of 1847, calling for a new election in November 1847. Thus Hudson could not take office for his elected term. However, shortly before the State election, Commissioner Jonas Earll, Jr. had died, and Hudson was appointed on December 3, 1846, by Governor Silas Wright to fill the vacancy and remained in office until the end of 1847.

In 1854, he was appointed by President Franklin Pierce to succeed William Ketchum as Collector of Customs at Buffalo.

He was a delegate to the 1860 Democratic National Convention.

== Personal life ==
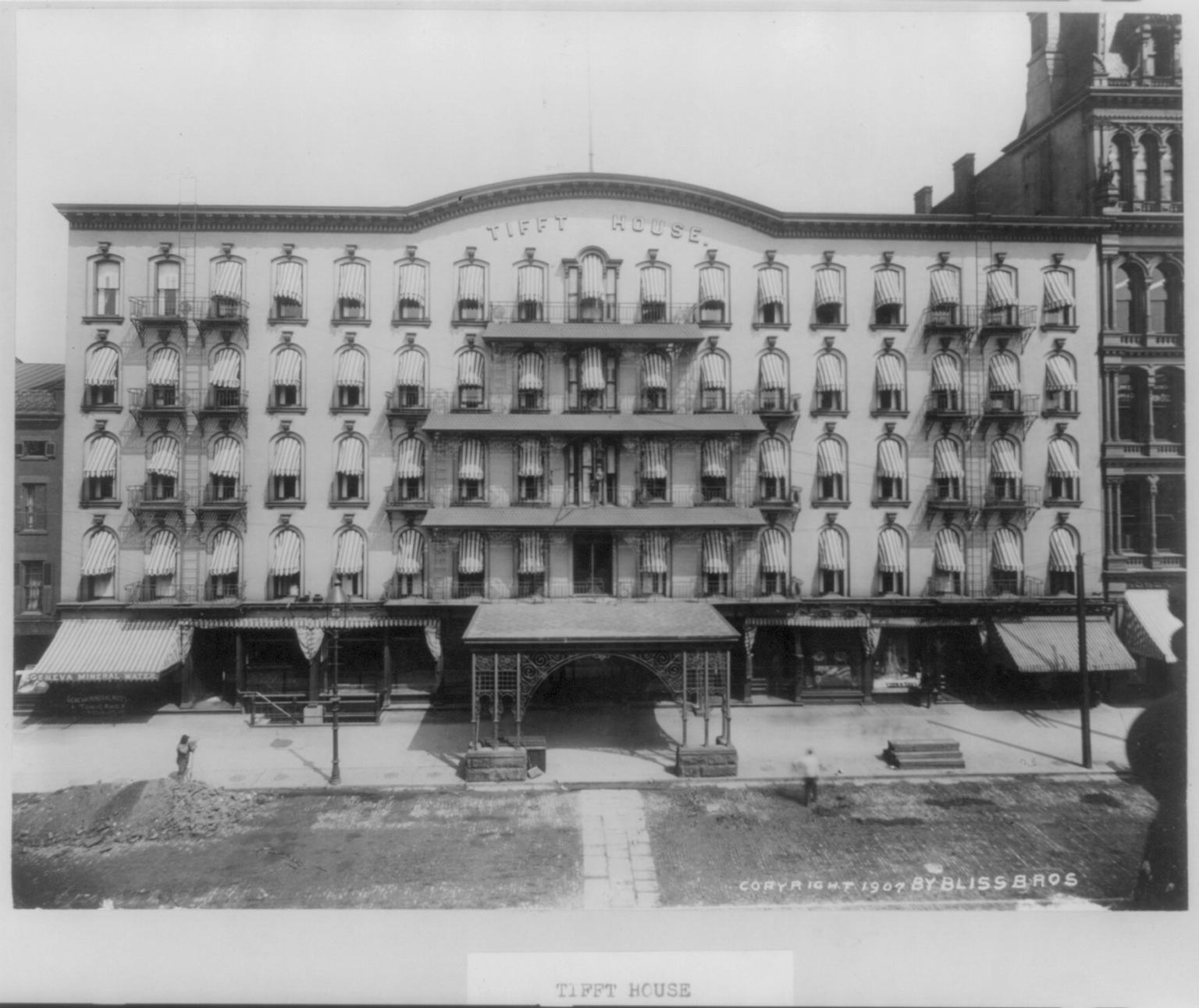
The Tifft House, Buffalo.

On November 18, 1840, Hudson was to married Gertrude Craig (1820–1851), daughter of Archibald Craig, a Schenectady banker, and Anna Maria (née Robinson) Craig. Together, they had one son:

- Archibald Craig Hudson (1841–1876), who was engaged in the malting business, with Andrew M. Marsh under the firm name Hudson & Marsh, until his death.

Both wife and son predeceased him. At his death, his nearest relatives were his cousin, Sir William Brown of Brown Bros., brokers in New York City, although Sir William lived in London. Hudson died on April 16, 1887, at the Tifft House hotel in Buffalo, his residence for the last twenty years of his life. After a funeral at St. Paul's Cathedral, he was buried at Forest Lawn Cemetery, Buffalo.
