= Charles Phelps Norton =

6th Chancellor of the University of Buffalo
- In office 1874–1884
- Preceded by: Wilson S. Bissell
- Succeeded by: Samuel P. Capen

Personal details
- Born: March 15, 1858 Buffalo, New York
- Died: July 11, 1923 (aged 65) Baltimore, Maryland
- Education: Harvard University

Charles Phelps Norton (March 15, 1858 – July 11, 1923) was chancellor of the University of Buffalo from 1909 to 1920. He was also a founder of the University of Buffalo Law School, now known as the State University of New York at Buffalo.

== Biography ==
Norton was born in Buffalo, New York in 1858 and was the son of Charles Davis Norton and Jeannette Phelps; whose grandmother Elizabeth "Betsy" Law (née Sherman) Phelps was the granddaughter of American founding father Roger Sherman. His brother, Porter Norton, was a lawyer who married Jennie H. Watson (daughter of Stephen Van Rensselaer Watson).

He went to Harvard University, where he was a classmate and friend of former President Theodore Roosevelt, in the class of 1880. Norton studied law and was admitted to the bar in 1885.

== Death and legacy ==
Norton died July 11, 1923, at Johns Hopkins Hospital in Baltimore, Maryland. He left his entire estate to the university, on the condition that within three years of the probate of the will, all principal and interest would be applied to the erection of a building known as Norton Hall to be used as a meeting place for student activities. He also endowed the Norton Medal, University at Buffalo's highest honor.

== Publications ==
- Frank M. Hollister
- Hand-Book of the Law of Bills and Notes: Designed Especially for the Use of Instructors and Students in Law Schools
- Hand-Book of the Law of Bills and Notes (several editions)
