= Dunkirk Light =

Lighthouse in New York, United States

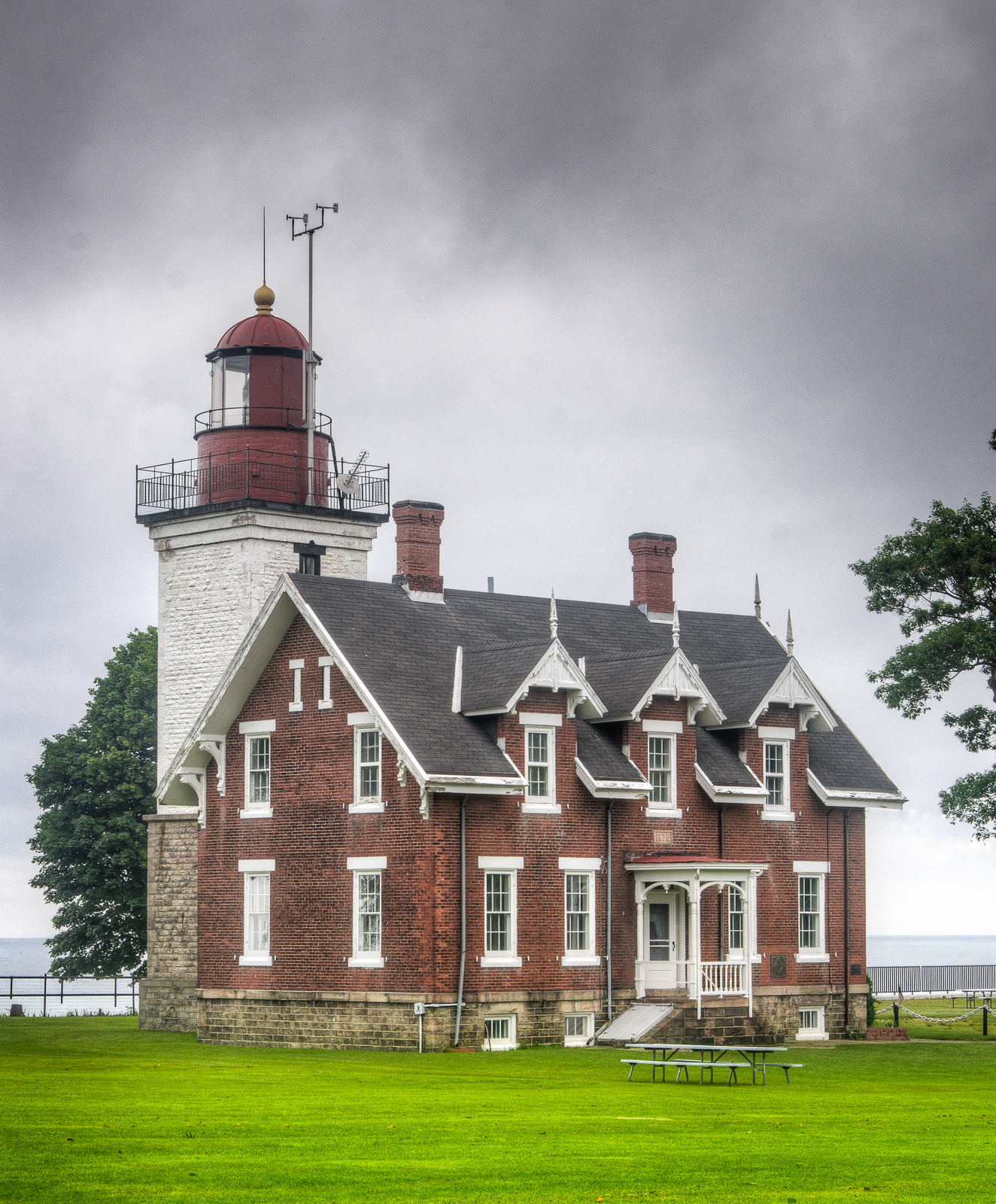
- Location: 1 Lighthouse Point Drive, Dunkirk, New York, Point Gratiot on Lake Erie
- Coordinates: 42°29′38″N 79°21′14″W

Tower
- Constructed: 1826
- Foundation: Dressed Stone
- Construction: Rubblestone encased in brick
- Automated: 1960
- Height: 18.5 m (61 ft)
- Shape: Square
- Markings: Upper 2/3 White, lower 1/3 natural, Red Lantern
- Heritage: National Register of Historic Places listed place

Light
- First lit: 1875
- Focal height: 82 feet (25 m)
- Lens: Third Order Fresnel lens
- Range: 13 nmi (24 km; 15 mi)
- Characteristic: Occulting White 4 seconds
- Point Gratiot Lighthouse Complex
- U.S. National Register of Historic Places
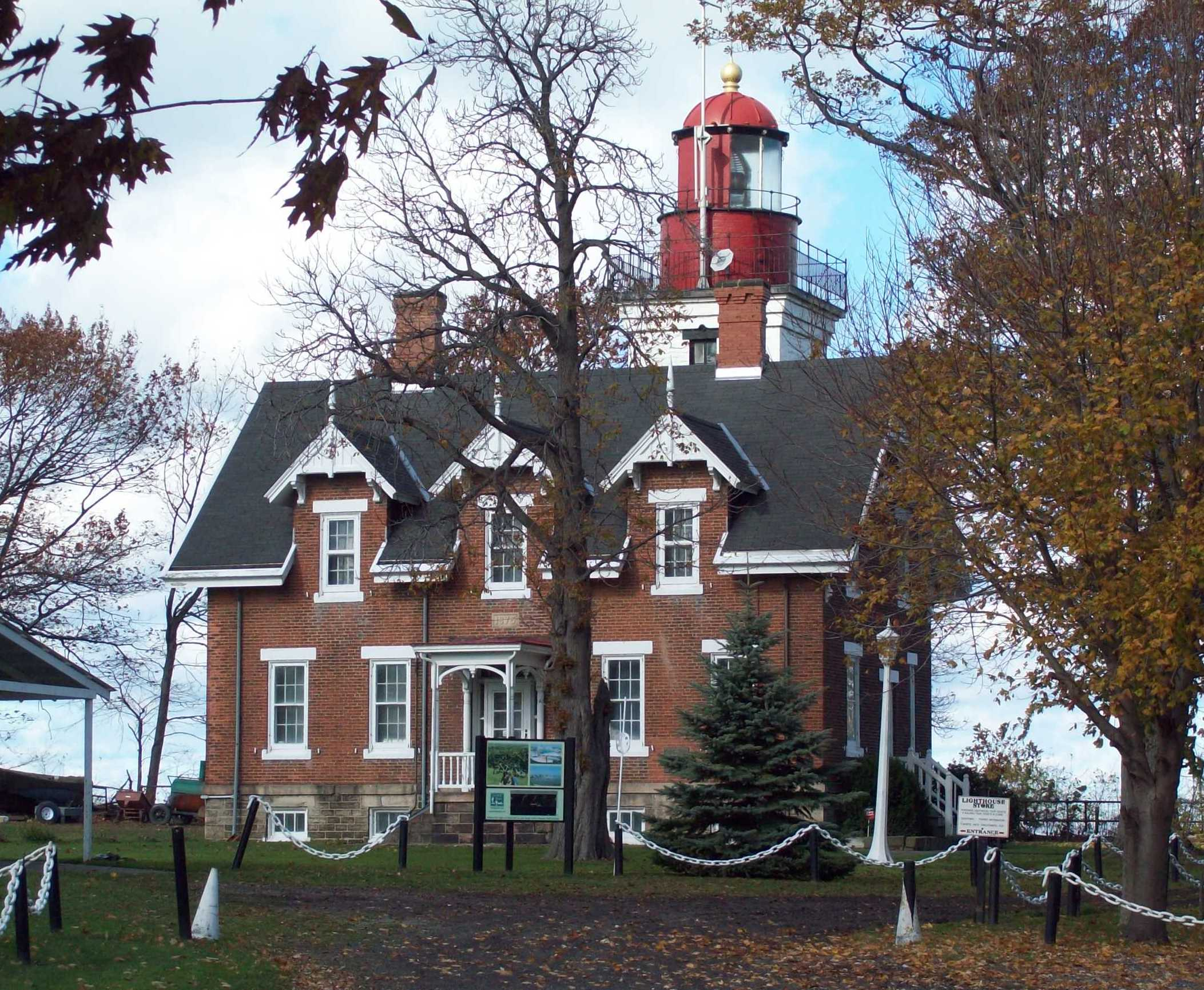
- Point Gratiot Light, November 2010
- Area: 3.9 acres (1.6 ha)
- Built: 1875
- Architectural style: Gothic, High Victorian Gothic
- NRHP reference No.: 79001568
- Added to NRHP: December 18, 1979

The Dunkirk Lighthouse, also known as the Point Gratiot Light, is an active lighthouse located at Point Gratiot on Lake Erie in New York state.

The lighthouse was established in 1826 and the current tower was first lit in 1875. The lighthouse was automated in 1960 and is still operational. The foundation is made out of dressed stone and the lighthouse is made out of rubblestone encased in brick. The tower is square-shaped with the upper two thirds in white and the lower third left natural and the lantern housing in red. The original lens is a third order Fresnel lens installed in 1857 in the original 1826 light and is still in operation. Its being still in use makes it a rarity. Only 70 such lenses are operational in the United States, 16 being on the Great Lakes of which two are in New York. At the entrance to the park property is the South Buffalo North Side Light, formerly located in Buffalo Harbor. It was added to the National Register of Historic Places as Point Gratiot Lighthouse Complex in 1979.

== History ==
In the 1868 Annual Report of the Lighthouse Board, approximately seven years before the rebuilding of the lighthouse, it was noted that the lighthouse was falling into disrepair:

“The keeper’s dwelling leaks and the plastering is out of order. The roof leaks and the sills of the covered way which connects the dwelling with the tower are rotten. The main tower is cracked, and the fence enclosing a portion of the grounds is of indifferent quality. The beacon tower is decayed and leaks. The alterations and improvements in progress at Dunkirk, under the direction of the engineer department of the arm, afford an appropriate occasion for renovating and perfecting the aids to navigation at this station.”

Additionally, in 1874, the Annual Report of the Lighthouse board, again, noted the rapidly declining condition of the lighthouse:

“The old tower is in a very precarious condition; large sections of the outer shell may fall off at any moment, thereby endangering not only the whole tower with the apparatus, but also the dwelling and its tenants. It is urgently recommended to rebuild the tower at the earliest possible time. An appropriation of $15,000 is required.”

The third order Fresnel lens added to the original lighthouse in 1857 was reused in the new 1875 lighthouse. It is currently valued at about $1.5 million.

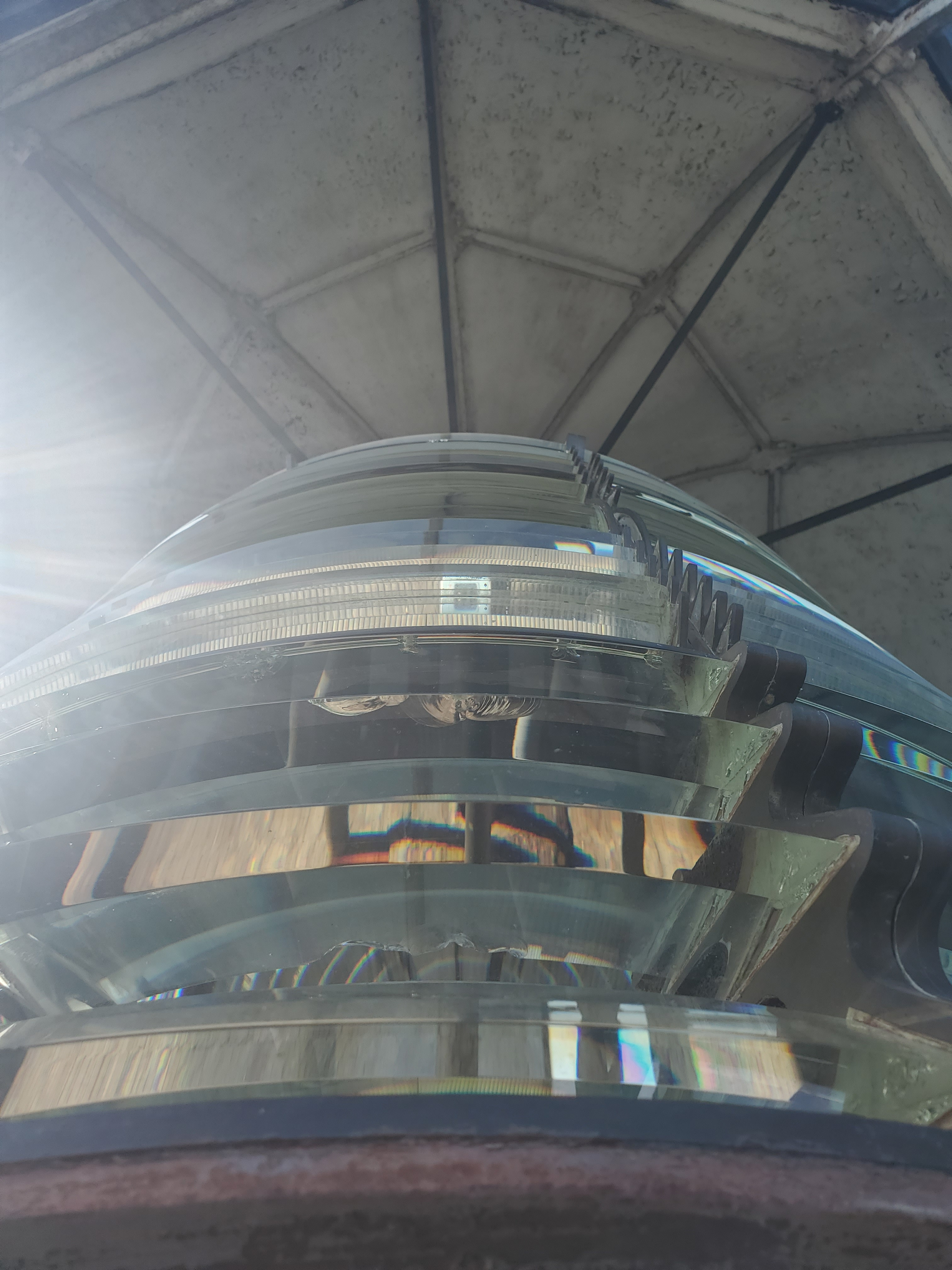
The Third Order Fresnel Lens

In 1960, along with the automation of the lighthouse, the assistant keeper's house was demolished.

After the automation of the lighthouse, local residents banded together, bought the property and repaired the building, turning it into a lighthouse and veteran's museum run by volunteers.

In 2022, the Dunkirk Planning Board approved the addition of a pavilion to the property for hosting weddings and other outdoor events.

== Assistant Keeper and Pier-head Light ==
The Dunkirk Lighthouse also worked in collaboration with the Dunkirk Pier-head light, guiding ships into the Dunkirk harbor. The assistant lighthouse keeper operated the pier-head light.

There have been five total towers that have served as the pier-head light. The first two were destroyed by ice from the lake. The third was removed in 1939, and replaced by a metal skeleton tower. The metal tower was then replaced by the current tower, and the skeleton tower now resides on the property of the Dunkirk Lighthouse.

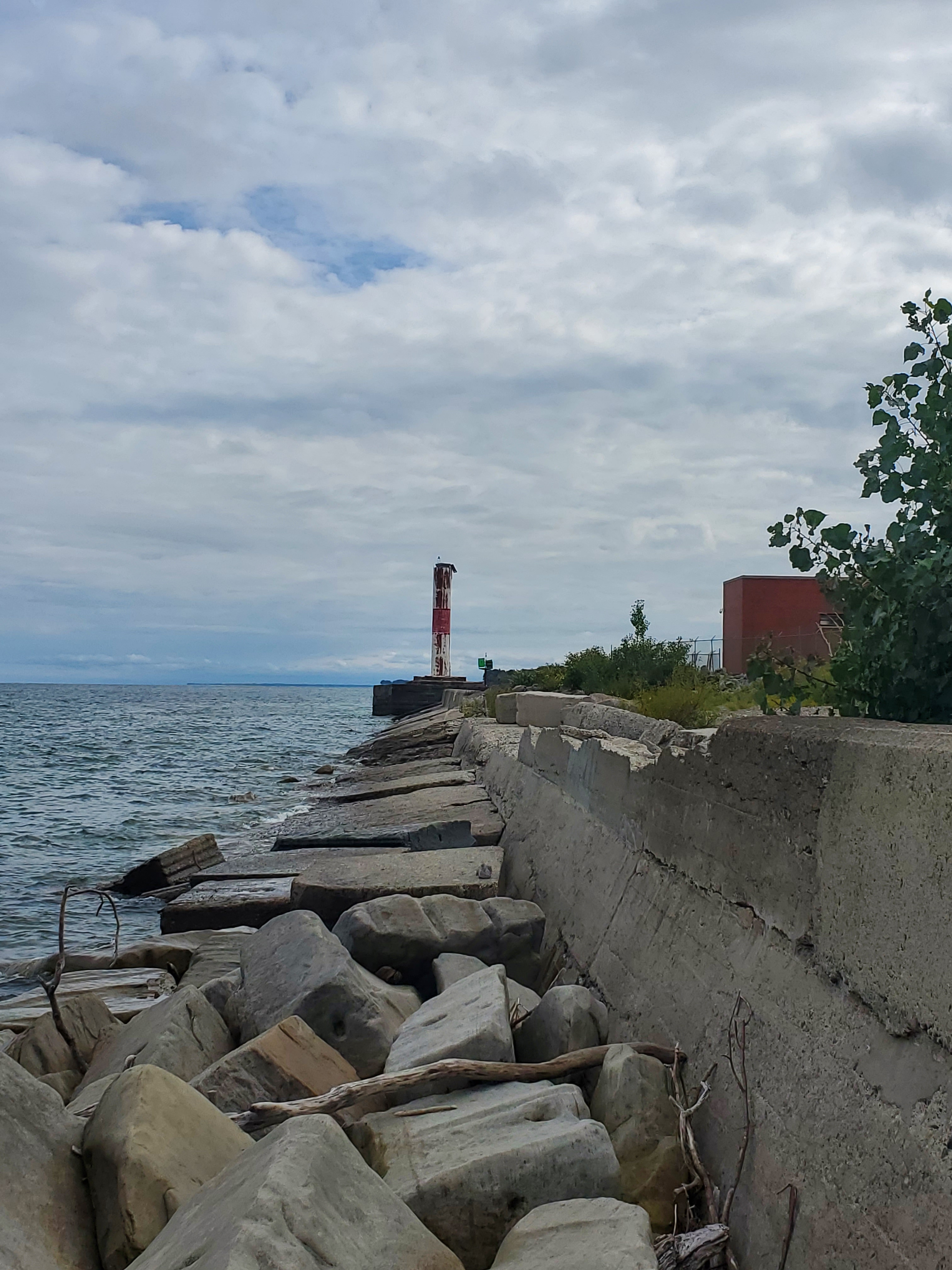
Current Dunkirk Pier-head Lighthouse from Point Gratiot Beach.

== Veteran's Museum ==
All four rooms of the second floor of the original keeper's house are part of the veteran's museum. There is one room devoted to each of the branches of the armed forces, with an additional building housing artifacts from the Coast Guard. Additionally, the hallway contains an exhibit on the Vietnam War. Almost all artifacts contained in the museum are donated by local residents or by the United States Coast Guard, due to their association with the lighthouse.

== Cultural ==
The Dunkirk Lighthouse is open seasonally from May through October. The hours are 10:00am to 2:00pm in the spring and fall, and 10:00am to 4:00pm in the summer. Guided tours include a climb to the top of the lighthouse, a tour of the keeper's house, Veteran museums and gift shop. The lighthouse is also open to private ghost investigations, and runs public ones in the fall through local paranormal investigators.

The Archives Center at the Smithsonian National Museum of American History has a collection (#1055) of souvenir postcards of lighthouses and has digitized 272 of these and made them available online. These include postcards of Dunkirk (Point Gratiot) Lighthouse with links to customized nautical charts provided by National Oceanographic and Atmospheric Administration.
