= Charles Davis Norton =

American government official

Collector of the Port of Buffalo
- In office 1865–1867
- Appointed by: Andrew Johnson
- Preceded by: Christian Metz Jr.
- Succeeded by: Joseph K. Tyler

Personal details
- Born: November 20, 1820 Hartford, Connecticut
- Died: April 11, 1867 (aged 46) Buffalo, New York
- Party: Whig
- Spouse: Jeannette Phelps
- Relations: Samuel Huntington Jr. (uncle)
- Children: Porter Norton; Charles Phelps Norton
- Parent(s): Lucretia Huntington; Joseph G. Norton
- Education: Union College

Charles Davis Norton (November 20, 1820 – April 11, 1867) was an American government official.

== Early life ==
Norton was born on November 20, 1820, in Hartford, Connecticut. He was the son of Lucretia (née Huntington) Horton and Capt. Joseph G. Norton (d. 1844), a well-known shipping merchant of Hartford.

His maternal grandfather was the Rev. Dr. Joseph Huntington, a Congregationalist minister of Coventry, Connecticut. His grandfather was the brother of Samuel Huntington, a Governor of Connecticut and signor of the U.S. Declaration of Independence. His uncle, Samuel Huntington Jr., served as the 3rd Governor of Ohio before becoming Chief Justice of the Ohio Supreme Court.

After preparing for college under private tutors, he attended Union College in Schenectady, New York, where he graduated with honors in 1840.

== Career ==
In 1827, he moved to Black Rock, New York, where his father had a dry-goods business with Judah Bliss known as Norton & Bliss. In 1830, they moved to nearby Buffalo. In 1839, he entered the law office of Horatio Shumway, with whom he continued his legal studies until 1841. He was admitted to the bar in 1843.

An ardent Whig, he supported the presidential prospects of Henry Clay. In 1849, he was elected City Attorney of Buffalo and in 1851 he was elected Surrogate of Erie County. In 1865, President Andrew Johnson appointed him Collector of the Port of Buffalo to succeed Christian Metz Jr., who had been appointed during the Lincoln administration. Norton served in this role until his death in 1867 after which Joseph K. Tyler was appointed to succeed him.

In 1865, Norton published The Old Ferry at the Black Rock, a book of the history of the ferry that crossed the Niagara River from the "black rock" near the foot of Fort Street to the Canadian shore from the time of the American Revolution.

== Personal life ==
In October 1851, Norton was married to Jeannette Phelps (1822–1889), a daughter of Oliver Phelps (grandson of U.S. Representative Oliver Phelps) and Laura (née Chapin) Phelps of Canandaigua, New York. Her grandmother, Elizabeth "Betsy" Law (née Sherman) Phelps, was the granddaughter of founding father Roger Sherman. Together, they were the parents of two sons:

- Porter Norton (1853–1918), a lawyer who married Jennie H. Watson, daughter of Stephen Van Rensselaer Watson and Charlotte (née Sherman) Watson of Buffalo.
- Charles Phelps Norton (1858–1923), a lawyer who became the 6th Chancellor of the University of Buffalo.

Norton died on April 11, 1867, in Buffalo. After a funeral at the First Presbyterian Church of Buffalo, he was buried at Forest Lawn Cemetery, Buffalo. His widow lived until September 10, 1889.

=== Descendants ===
Through his eldest son Porter, he was a grandfather of Porter Huntington Norton (who married Gilbertine Love Coakley) and Gertrude Van Dolfson Norton (who married Daniel Willard Streeter).
