= Henry K. Smith =

American politician

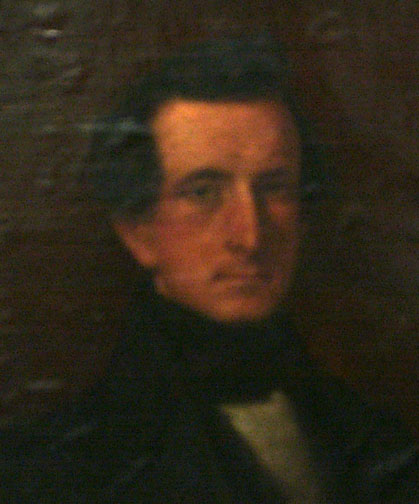
- Portrait of Henry K. Smith

20th Mayor of Buffalo
- In office 1850–1851
- Preceded by: Hiram Barton
- Succeeded by: James Wadsworth

Personal details
- Born: April 2, 1811 St. Croix, Virgin Islands
- Died: September 23, 1854 (aged 43) Buffalo, New York
- Party: Locofocos, Democrat
- Spouse(s): married twice; Miss Voorhees, Sally Ann Thompson
- Children: two children

Henry Kendall Smith (1811–1854) was Mayor of the City of Buffalo, New York, serving 1850–1851. He was born on April 2, 1811, in St. Croix, Virgin Islands. In 1819, he was sent to Baltimore, Maryland, for education and then moved to New York City in 1828. Shortly thereafter he moved to Johnstown, New York, to study law, opening a practice in 1832. In 1833, he moved to Buffalo and began a legal partnership with Israel T. Hatch. He married Miss Voorhees of Johnstown in 1834; she died shortly thereafter and he remarried in June 1848, to Sally Ann Thompson, daughter of ex-Mayor Sheldon Thompson. He was appointed District Attorney for Erie County in December 1836. At the outbreak of the Patriot War he was made captain of one of the companies of citizen volunteers. In 1848, he was appointed Postmaster of Buffalo.

On March 5, 1850, the local elections were held and Locofoco candidate Henry K. Smith was elected. During his term, he supported various civic improvements. His term ended on March 11, 1851. A rabid pro-slavery advocate, he was made the Fugitive Slave Commissioner in Western New York following the passage of the Fugitive Slave Law which his fellow Buffalonian Milliard Fillmore, the President of the United States, signed into law. Smith oversaw the rendition on one slave, Harrison Williams, back into slavery. Smith received national attention over his efforts to have Daniel Davis, a fugitive seized on the docks of Buffalo, returned to his alleged owner in Kentucky. The backlash against the law in Buffalo and nationally left Smith in a difficult position where he was criticized severely and perhaps ostracized. The social atmosphere of Smith's Buffalo was greatly affected by the publishing of Harriet Beecher Stowe's anti-slavery novel Uncle Tom's Cabin which became an instant phenomenon. After leaving office, he continued his law partnership and died on September 23, 1854. He is buried in an unmarked grave at Forest Lawn Cemetery.

Political offices
Preceded by Hiram Barton	Mayor of Buffalo, NY; 1850–1851	Succeeded by James Wadsworth
