= Lafayette Caskey =

American politician

Lafayette Caskey (September 6, 1824 – October 5, 1881) was an American carpenter and politician.

Born in Canton Ohio, Caskey went to the public schools. In 1845, Caskey moved to Potosi, Grant County, Wisconsin Territory. He was a carpenter. In 1875, Caskey served in the Wisconsin State Assembly and was a Republican.
