= Ebenezer Walden =

American politician (1777–1857)

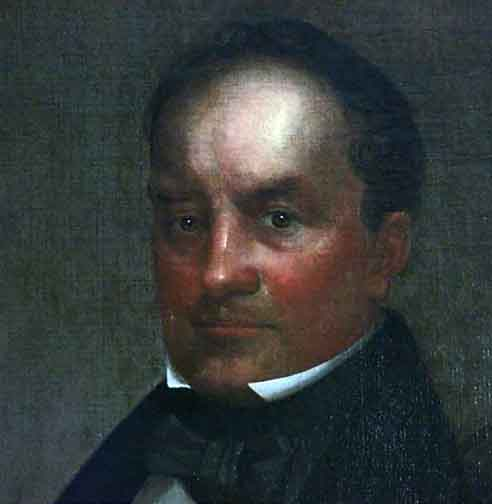
- Portrait of Ebenezer Walden

8th Mayor of Buffalo
- In office 1838–1839
- Preceded by: Pierre A. Barker
- Succeeded by: Hiram Pratt

Personal details
- Born: 1777 Massachusetts
- Died: November 10, 1857 (aged 79–80) Lake View, New York
- Party: Whig
- Spouse: Suzanna Marvin
- Children: four children
- "Ebenezer Walden". Through The Mayor's Eyes, The Only Complete History of the Mayor's of Buffalo, New York, Compiled by Michael Rizzo. The Buffalonian is produced by The Peoples History Union. May 27, 2009. Archived from the original on May 17, 2008.

Ebenezer Walden (1777 – November 10, 1857) was mayor of Buffalo, New York, serving in 1838–1839. He was born in 1777 in Massachusetts. In 1799, he graduated from Williams College, then made his way to Oneida County, New York where he studied law. In 1806, he was admitted to the New York State bar and moved to Buffalo. For nearly two years Walden was the only lawyer west of Batavia. He invested heavily in real estate in this area, owning what became known as Walden Farm at what is now Fillmore and Best Street. (Best Street becomes Walden Avenue after crossing Genesee Street.) In 1812, he married Suzanna Marvin.

He was a member of the New York State Assembly (Cattaraugus, Chautauqua and Niagara Co.) in 1812. During the War of 1812 Walden leased land to the Federal government and the Buffalo Barracks are erected. The front portion of the barracks later became what is the Theodore Roosevelt Inaugural National Historic Site. He was one of the few who stayed behind during the burning of Buffalo and trying to save as many lives as possible. Walden's home was used by General Winfield Scott as his headquarters. After the war, he erected the first brick dwelling in Buffalo.

He was one of the four original trustees of the village of Buffalo and served as a member of the Buffalo Harbor Company, which improved Buffalo's harbor to attract the village as the western terminus of the Erie Canal. Walden became the first judge of Erie County Court in 1823 and held the position for five years. He was a presidential elector in 1828. In the 1830s, Walden was among the city leaders who supported the creation of a "University of Western New-York," which was chartered by the New York State Legislature in 1836. Walden donated property in support of the project, however the university would not ultimately develop; this effort did, however, lay the foundation for the 1846 establishment of the University of Buffalo (later University at Buffalo, SUNY).

On March 13, 1838, the Common Council met and made Walden its choice for mayor. During his term, the entire school system was reorganized. After his term as mayor, Walden retired to his farm in Lake View, New York. He died there on November 10, 1857, and was buried in the Myer–Walden mausoleum in Forest Lawn Cemetery.

Walden Avenue named after him in his honor for his works.

Political offices
Preceded by Pierre A. Barker	Mayor of Buffalo, NY; 1838–1839	Succeeded by Sheldon Thompson
