= Warren Bryant (banker) =

American banker (1811–1893)

Collector of the Port of Buffalo
- In office 1858–1861
- Appointed by: James Buchanan
- Preceded by: John T. Hudson
- Succeeded by: Christian Metz Jr.

Personal details
- Born: March 24, 1811 Woburn, Massachusetts
- Died: August 5, 1893 (aged 82) Buffalo, New York
- Spouse: Amelia E. Stebbins
- Children: 8

Warren Bryant (March 24, 1811 – August 5, 1893) was an American banker.

== Early life ==
Bryant was born on March 24, 1811, in Woburn, Massachusetts into a family that had lived in New England since the middle of the 16th century. He was a son of Warren Bryant and Esther (née Wright) Bryant.

== Career ==
In 1827, he first visited Buffalo on his way to see Niagara Falls, returning to Buffalo to reside permanently in 1832. He went into business as an importer of toys and fancy goods and was joined by his brother George H. Bryant in a store on Main Street near Exchange Street (which he bought in 1847). He sold the business in 1857 after which he bought the Niagara Street Railroad, serving as its president, before it was sold to the Buffalo Street Railway Company.

On May 9, 1846, Bryant was an original member of board of trustees of the Buffalo Savings Bank among Millard Fillmore, Albert H. Tracy (who served as the third president), John L. Kimberly, Noah H. Gardner, Francis J. Handel, Dr. Frederick Dellenbaugh, Jacob Seibold, Elijah D. Efner, Isaac Sherman, William Tweedy, Hiram P. Thayer, Benjamin Caryl, Judge Charles Townsend (who served as the first president), Francis C. Brunck, and Ernest G. Gray. He began serving as president around 1864, and served until his death in 1893. At the time of his death, he was the last surviving original trustee of the Bank.

In 1858, President James Buchanan appointed Bryant to succeed John T. Hudson as the Collector of the Port of Buffalo. He served until 1861 when he was replaced by Christian Metz Jr. (who was appointed by Abraham Lincoln).

== Personal life ==
In 1840, Bryant was married to Amelia E. Stebbins (1819–1890) of Oneida County, New York. Together they, were the parents of ten children, including:

- Joseph S. Bryant (1854–1924), a banker with Columbia National Bank (which was absorbed by the Marine Trust Company); he married Alice Taft of Whitinsville, Massachusetts.
- Mary Steele Bryant (1855–1907), who collected a china and curio cabinet which was donated by her brother Joseph's widow to the Buffalo Historical Society.

His wife died in North Conway, New Hampshire while visiting there in September 1890. Bryant died at his home, 161 Delaware Avenue in Buffalo, on August 5, 1893. After a funeral at his home led by the Rev. E. E. Chivers of the Prospect Avenue Baptist Church, he was buried at Forest Lawn Cemetery, Buffalo. He left an estate worth $80,000 (equivalent to $2,867,000 in 2025). To his daughter Mary, he left 179 Main Street; to his son Warren, he left 25 shares of the Bank of Buffalo and 20 shares of Third National Bank of Buffalo; to his son Joseph, he left 60 shares of M&T Bank.
