= Eli Cook (lawyer) =

American politician (1814–1865)

23rd Mayor of Buffalo
- In office 1853, 1854–1855
- Preceded by: Hiram Barton
- Succeeded by: Frederick P. Stevens

Personal details
- Born: January 23, 1814 Palatine Bridge, New York, U.S.
- Died: February 25, 1865 (aged 51) Buffalo, New York, U.S.
- Party: Democratic
- Spouse: Sarah L. (m. 1843)

Eli Cook Jr. (January 23, 1814 – February 25, 1865) was an American lawyer and politician. He served as mayor of Buffalo, New York, in 1853 and again from 1854 to 1855.

== Life and career ==
Eli Cook was born in Palatine Bridge, New York, on January 23, 1814. He took up law in 1830, passed the bar exam, and in 1837 he practiced in Tennessee and Mississippi with rebel General Simon B. Buckner. In 1838, he moved to Buffalo where he became one of the leading criminal lawyers. He married around 1838, but his wife died soon after; he re-married in 1843, to Sarah L. He was appointed city attorney in 1845, and again in 1851.

He was elected mayor of Buffalo on March 1, 1853, as the Democratic candidate. During his term, the city charter was revised to make the mayor's term two years and the Common Council would elect its own presiding officer; the mayor would no longer be president. Additionally, many of the city offices that were filled by Council appointment were now to be elective. The charter also annexed Black Rock into the city of Buffalo. He was reelected for a second term on November 8, 1853, as the first two-year Buffalo mayor, and the first mayor to serve consecutive terms.

After serving as mayor he returned to his law practice. He died on February 25, 1865, and was buried in Forest Lawn Cemetery.

Political offices
Preceded by Hiram Barton	List of mayors of Buffalo, New York; 1853–1855	Succeeded by Frederick P. Stevens
