= Gerrit L. Dox =

American politician

Gerrit Lansing Dox (December 13, 1784 – August 2, 1847) was an American politician.

== Early life ==
He was born in Albany, New York, on December 13, 1784, to Pieter Dox and Cathalyntje Lansing. He was baptised on May 20, 178. His brother Myndert M. Dox was the Collector of the Port of Buffalo.

== Career ==
He was appointed Postmaster of Albany in January 1816 in the place of his brother Peter P. Dox, who had held the post from 1814 until his death in office on November 21, 1815. In 1821, Gerrit Dox was succeeded by Solomon Southwick.

He was New York State Treasurer from February 1817 to January 1821.

In August 1823, the U.S. Postmaster General sued Dox for his failure to render accounts and to pay over some monies received. In the suit, it was stated that Dox had become insolvent in 1819.

In 1839, he was appointed a justice of the Justices Court of Albany.

== Personal life ==
In January 1817, he married Magdalena Bogart.

He died on August 2, 1847 Waterloo, New York. He and his wife were buried at the Pulteney Street Cemetery in Geneva, New York.

== Sources ==
- Political Graveyard (name given as Gerret L. Dox)
- The New York Civil List compiled by Franklin Benjamin Hough (pages 35; Weed, Parsons and Co., 1858) (Google Books) (name given as Gerret L. Dox)
- Dox vs. Postmaster General, 26 U.S. 318 (1828) at supreme.justia.com
- Dox vs. Postmaster General, 26 U.S. 318 (1828) at bulk.resource.org
- History of Political Parties in the State of New-York by John Stilwell Jenkins (pages 178 and 238; Alden & Markham, Auburn NY, 1846)
- The Annals of Albany by Joel Munsell (1855) (name given as Gerrit L. Dox [p. 116] and Garret L. Dox, "of Auburn" [p. 121])
- The Laws of New York (Legislative session 1821) (name given as Garret L. Dox)
- The Annals of Albany by Joel Munsell (page 291; Munsell & Rowland, Albany, 1859) (name given as Garret L. Dox)
- Burials at Pulteney Street Cemetery, at RootsWeb

Political offices
Preceded by Charles Z. Platt	New York State Treasurer; 1817–1821	Succeeded by Benjamin Knower
