= Lake View, New York =

Hamlet in Erie County, New York, United States

Coordinates: 42°42′40″N 78°56′09″W

Lake View is an affluent hamlet in Erie County, New York, United States.

Lake View is in the town of Hamburg, an outer ring suburb of Buffalo.

== Geography ==
Lake View in 1907

Lake View is 15 miles (24 km) south of Buffalo along Lake Erie. It is bounded by Eighteen Mile Creek on the south, Pleasant Avenue on the north, Lake Erie on the west and the village of Hamburg on the east.

== History ==
Early settlers were Ebenezer Ames, Jacob F. Schoellkopf, a successful entrepreneur in western New York, and Ebenezer Walden, a prominent Buffalo attorney and mayor whose family built the Lake View Hotel in 1880 to serve the many traveling salesmen who arrived on the seven daily trains on the Lake Shore and Michigan Southern Railway (later part of New York Central Railroad) to sell their wares in the surrounding countryside. The salesmen (called "drummers") would rent a horse and buggy from the livery stable behind the six-room hotel to make their rounds.

Lake View Hotel in 1908

By 1890, two more railroads ran through Lake View - the New York, Chicago and St. Louis Railroad (the Nickel Plate Road) and the Pennsylvania Railroad which brought economic prosperity to the small community. An electric trolley called the Buffalo & Erie was built to facilitate travel to and from Buffalo and operated until the mid-1930s.

In 1882, the Idlewood Association, a summer resort colony in Lake View was founded by Buffalo businessmen where members, including James N. Adam and John D. Larkin, had summer residences.

Also established were the Lake View School in 1890, the Gatling Land Boom in 1893, the Day Bicycle Factory in 1895, and the Lake View Fire Association in 1923.

During World War II, two young women named Winifred Stadler and Rita Fierle produced a newsletter called the Lake View Local which was sent to the town's men and women serving their country abroad.

In the late 1950s, the Lake View Community Association produced a cookbook called "The ABC's of Cooking" which contained many favorite recipes from the town's residents.

== Religious Institutions ==
The Lake View Community Church was established in 1889.

Our Lady of Perpetual Help Roman Catholic Church was established in 1921; On September 1, 2001, it and the congregation from St. Vincent de Paul Roman Catholic Church were merged and officially renamed Blessed John Paul II Parish. Upon the canonization of John Paul II on April 27, 2014, the parish assumed the name of St. John Paul II R.C. Church.

== Notable people ==
- William Stachowski, former New York state senator
- Francis J. Pordum, former New York state assemblyman
- Ebenezer Walden, former mayor of Buffalo, New York
