= Collector of the Port of Buffalo =

Port of New York federal appointment

U.S. federal government appointment overview
- Formed: 1805
- Dissolved: 1965
- Type: Collector of import duties on foreign goods
- Jurisdiction: Port of Buffalo
- Parent department: United States Department of the Treasury

The Collector of Customs at the Port of Buffalo, most often referred to as Collector of the Port of Buffalo, sometimes referred to as Buffalo Creek, was a federal officer who was in charge of the collection of import duties on foreign goods that entered the United States by ship at the Port of Buffalo.

== History ==
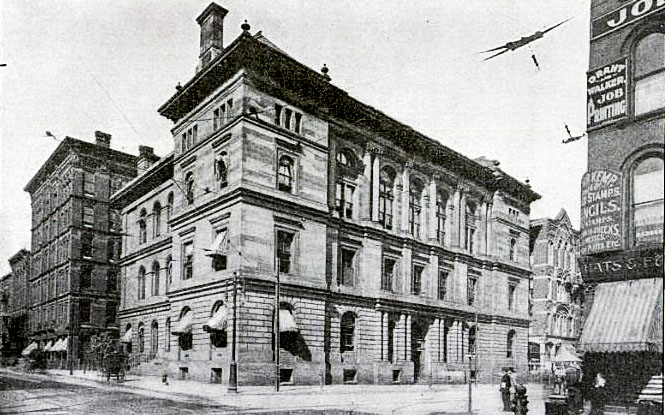
United States Custom House, Buffalo, Washington and Seneca Streets, 1901

Buffalo Creek was made a Port of Entry in 1805 by President Thomas Jefferson. On March 11, 1811, President James Madison issued a proclamation removing the port of entry for the Buffalo district to Black Rock (which was not a part of Buffalo at the time), (Note: Black Rock was twice burned to the ground by the British during the War of 1812 and, in 1839, it was incorporated as a town. In 1853, the City of Buffalo annexed the town of Black Rock.) in pursuance of an act of Congress dated March 2, 1811, which provided that "the office of the Collector of Customs for the District of Buffaloe Creek shall be kept at such place or places in the town of Buffalo as President of the United States shall designate." In 1817, Forward, as Collector of the Port, was authorized by the Treasury Department to purchase a site for a light house. Forward negotiated with Joseph Ellicott, agent of the Holland Land Company, to purchase the property near the outlet of the Buffalo Creek for $350.

In August 1965, it was announced that the Buffalo Customs District was enlarged under President Lyndon B. Johnson's national reorganization plan to include the Toronto Airport and the ports of Buffalo and Niagara Falls. The two U.S. ports were consolidated and became known as "Buffalo-Niagara Falls". Additionally, the Buffalo district absorbed the Rochester Customs District which included the ports of Rochester, Oswego, Sodus Point, Syracuse and Utica. The Buffalo Customs District became part of the Boston region. In the reorganization, the collectors, who were appointed by the president, were abolished and replaced by port directors under a district director.

== List of collectors ==
- (1804–1812) Erastus Granger; appointed by Thomas Jefferson (Callender Irvine was appointed in February 1804 but declined)
- (1812–1822) Oliver Forward; (Note: Oliver Forward (1781–1834), was a brother of U.S. Representatives Walter Forward and Chauncey Forward.) appointed by James Madison;
- (1822–1829) Myndert M. Dox; appointed by James Monroe
- (1829–1838) Pierre A. Barker; appointed by Andrew Jackson
- (1838–1842) George W. Clinton; appointed by Martin Van Buren
- (1842–1845) Jedediah Hyde Lathrop; appointed by John Tyler
- (1845–1849) Henry W. Rogers; appointed by James K. Polk
- (1850–1851) Levi Allen; appointed by Zachary Taylor
- (1851–1854) William Ketchum, appointed by Millard Fillmore
- (1854–1858) John T. Hudson, appointed by Franklin Pierce
- (1858–1861) Warren Bryant; appointed by James Buchanan
- (1861–1865) Christian Metz Jr.; appointed by Abraham Lincoln
- (1865–1867) Charles Davis Norton; appointed by Andrew Johnson
- (1867–1869) Joseph K. Tyler; appointed by Andrew Johnson
- (1869–1870) Samuel J. Holley; appointed by Ulysses S. Grant
- (1870–1877) Rodney W. Daniels; appointed by Ulysses S. Grant
- (1877–1881) John Tyler; appointed by Rutherford B. Hayes
- (1881–1885) Charles A. Gould, appointed by Chester A. Arthur
- (1885–1889) Arthur D. Bissell, appointed by Grover Cleveland
- (1889–1893) William J. Morgan, appointed by Benjamin Harrison
- (1893–1897) Peter C. Doyle; appointed by Grover Cleveland
- (1897–1906) Henry W. Brendel; appointed by William McKinley
- (1906–1914) Fred O. Murray; appointed by Theodore Roosevelt
- (1914–1918) George Bleistein; appointed by Woodrow Wilson
- (1918–1922) George G. Davidson Jr.; appointed by Woodrow Wilson
- (1922–1934) Fred A. Bradley; appointed by Warren G. Harding
- (1934–1935) William J. O'Brian; appointed by Franklin D. Roosevelt
- (1936–1944) Martin O. Bement; appointed by Franklin D. Roosevelt
- (1945–1954) Ross E. Brown; appointed by Franklin D. Roosevelt
- (1954–1962) Harold R. Becker; appointed by Dwight D. Eisenhower
- (1962–1965) Frank A. Sedita; appointed by John F. Kennedy
