= Buffalo Main Light =

Lighthouse in New York, United States

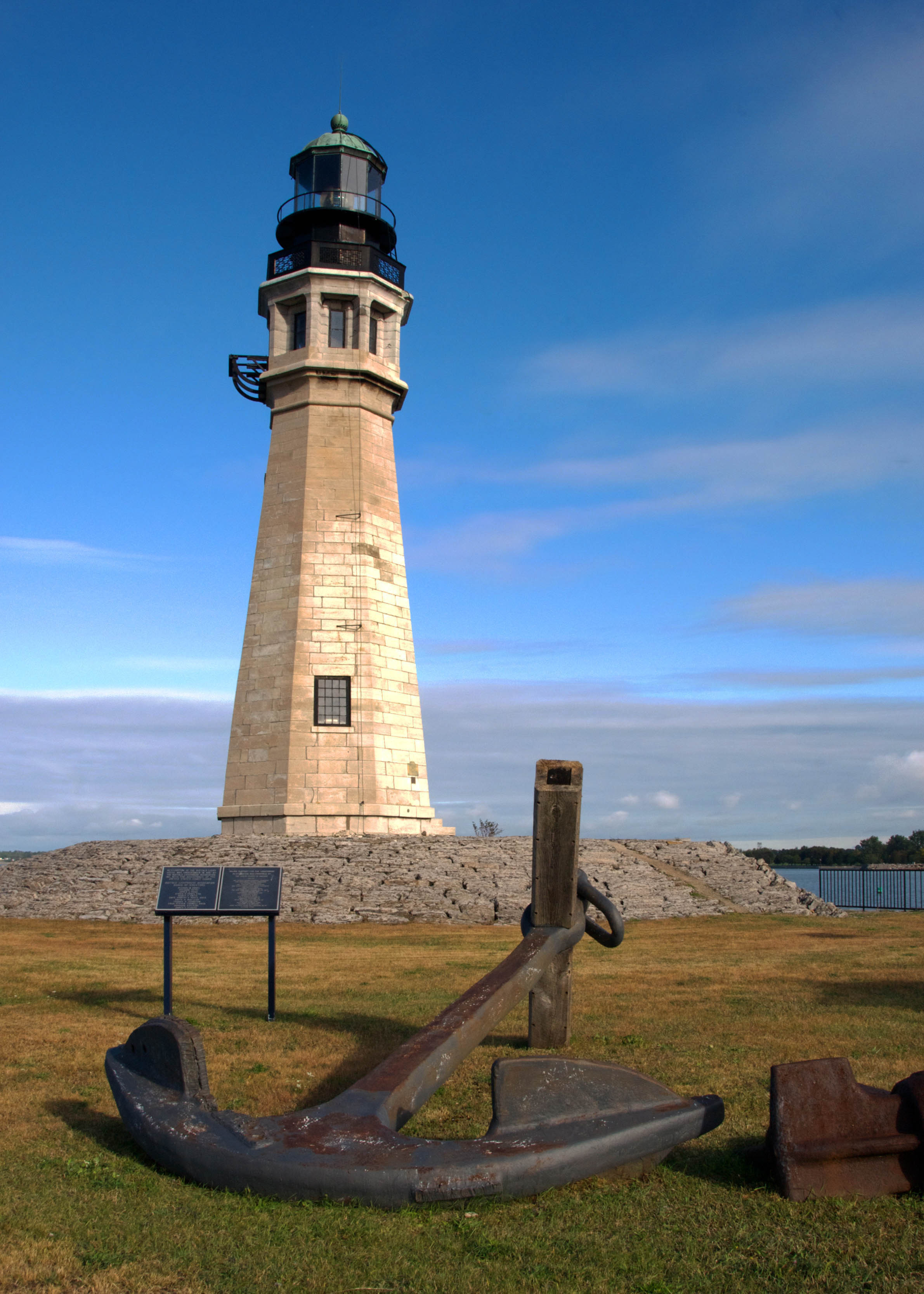
- Location: Buffalo River, Buffalo, New York
- Coordinates: 42°52′40.15″N 78°53′22.20″W

Tower
- Constructed: 1833
- Foundation: Stone molehead
- Construction: Limestone and cast iron
- Height: 60 feet (18 m)
- Shape: Octagonal
- Heritage: National Register of Historic Places listed place

Light
- First lit: 1833
- Deactivated: 1914
- Focal height: 23 m (75 ft)
- Characteristic: F W
- Buffalo Main Light
- U.S. National Register of Historic Places
- New York State Register of Historic Places
- Area: 0.5 acres (0.20 ha)
- MPS: U.S. Coast Guard Lighthouses and Light Stations on the Great Lakes TR
- NRHP reference No.: 84002383
- NYSRHP No.: 02940.000010

Significant dates
- Added to NRHP: July 19, 1984
- Designated NYSRHP: July 19, 1984

Buffalo (Main) Light is a lighthouse at the mouth of Buffalo River/Erie Canal, directly across from the Erie Basin Marina in Buffalo, New York.

== History ==
The lighthouse was established and lit in 1833 and was deactivated in 1914. The foundation material was stone molehead and the lighthouse was constructed out of limestone and cast iron. The shape of the tower was octagonal and was 60 feet (18 m) high. The lens installed in 1857 was a third order Fresnel lens. The lens was later removed to the Buffalo History Museum.

This 60-foot-tall, octagonal limestone structure is the oldest still standing in its original location in the city of Buffalo. It replaced the original 1818 light on this site along the Lake Erie shore at the mouth of the Buffalo River. Presently, it is part of an outdoor museum located on the grounds of the United States Coast Guard Station.

It was listed on the National Register of Historic Places in 1984.

In 2010, the Coast Guard announced it would relinquish 4.6 acres (1.9 ha) of its 31 acres (13 ha) on the point and Congressman Brian Higgins obtained over $6 million to reconfigure the Coast Guard station to allow public access to the lighthouse. In April 2011, Erie Canal Harbor Development Corporation approved a grant of $170,700 to repair and restore the lighthouse in anticipation of public tours. The work was completed in August 2011.
