= Daniel O'Day (disambiguation) =

Daniel O'Day (1870–1916) was an American oil refiner.

Daniel O'Day may also refer to:

- Daniel O'Day (banker) (1844–1906), father of the above; American banker and oil refiner.
- Daniel O'Day (American football)
