= Elizabeth Bailey (disambiguation) =

Elizabeth Bailey (1938–2022) was an American economist.

Elizabeth Bailey may also refer to:

- Elizabeth Bailey, character played by Susie Blake

== See also ==
- Elisabeth Tova Bailey, author
- Elizabeth Bailey Gomez (c. 1790–1879)
- Betty Bailey (disambiguation)
- Beth Bailey, fictional character
- Beth Bailey (historian) (born 1957)
