= Arthur D. Bissell =

American banker

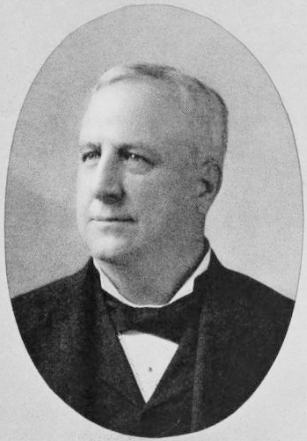

President of the People's Bank of Buffalo
- In office 1903–1920
- Preceded by: Daniel O'Day
- Succeeded by: Howard Bissell

Collector of the Port of Buffalo
- In office 1885–1889
- Appointed by: Grover Cleveland
- Preceded by: Charles A. Gould
- Succeeded by: William J. Morgan

Personal details
- Born: Arthur Douglas Bissell; January 10, 1844 New London, New York, US
- Died: November 13, 1926 (aged 82) Buffalo, New York, US
- Spouse: Fanny Castle (m. 1876)
- Relations: Wilson S. Bissell (brother)
- Children: 7
- Parent(s): Isabella Jeannette Hally; John Bissell
- Education: Yale University

Arthur Douglas Bissell (January 10, 1844 – November 13, 1926) was an American banker who served as the Collector of Customs for the Port of Buffalo.

== Early life ==
Bissell was born on January 10, 1844, in New London, New York and was of Scotch-Irish ancestry. He was the son of Isabella Jeannette (née Hally) Bissell (1813–1885) and John Bissell (1808–1889), who was involved in the transportation business. His younger brother, Wilson Shannon Bissell, was also a Yale graduate who became Postmaster General under President Grover Cleveland, Wilson's former law partner. He also served as President of the Buffalo and Geneva Railroad. His sister, Mary Eleanor Bissell, was the wife of Dexter Phelps Rumsey.

In 1852, at the age of six, his family moved to Buffalo. He was educated at Clinton Preparatory School, and received a B.A. from Yale University in 1867, where he was a member of Skull and Bones.

== Career ==
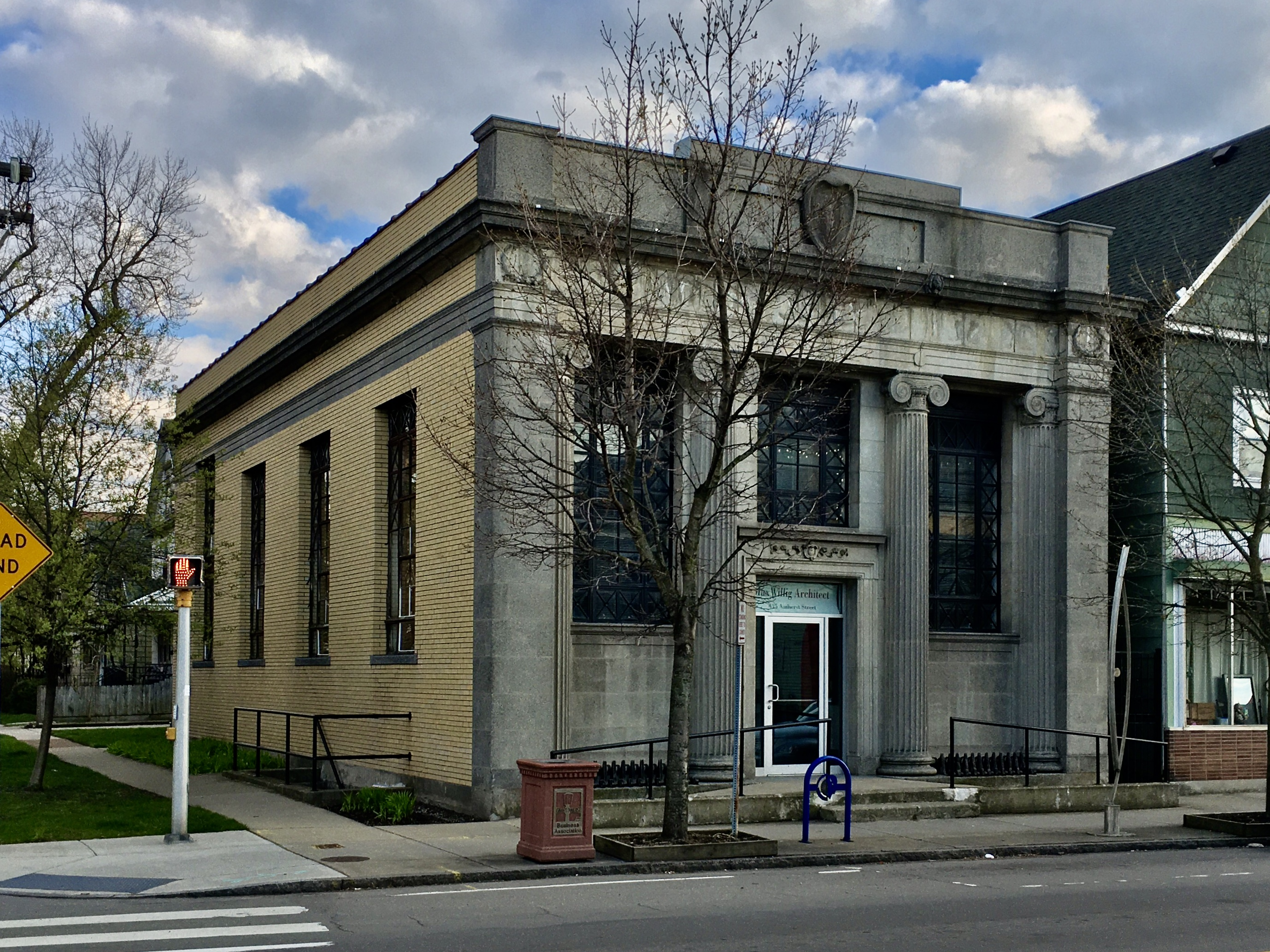
The People's Bank of Buffalo building at Amherst and Germain Street, Buffalo, erected in 1920

Upon graduation Arthur joined his father and uncle at the Bissell Transportation Company and served as the Buffalo agent of the Erie Boatmen's Transportation Company. A Democrat, he was an unsuccessful candidate for Superintendent of Public Works in Buffalo in 1883. In May 1885, he was appointed by his brother's good friend, Grover Cleveland, as Collector of Customs for the Port of Buffalo to succeed Charles A. Gould, under whose tenure the annual collection of the port increased from $800,000 in 1881 to $1,500,000 in 1885.

In 1889, he helped form and was elected vice president of the newly created People's Bank of Buffalo. In 1903, he succeeded Daniel O'Day to become president of the bank serving until 1920 when he was succeeded as president by his son, Howard, and became chairman of the board of directors. He also served as president of the New York State Bankers Association. The People's Bank of Buffalo merged with Manufacturers and Traders Trust in 1927, creating a new company known as Manufacturers and Traders-People's Trust Company, with about $135,000,000 in combined deposits. The bank was headquartered in M&T's Fidelity Trust Building with Lewis G. Harriman as president and Howard Bissell as chairman of the board.

== Personal life ==
On June 16, 1876, Bissell married Frances "Fanny" Castle (1852–1929), a daughter of Fanny (née Durkee) Castle and silversmith Daniel Beech Castle who was originally from Bethlehem, Connecticut. He was a Presbyterian and a member of the Ellicott Club of Buffalo, the University Club of Buffalo and the Country Club of Buffalo. Together, Arthur and Fanny resided at 950 Delaware Avenue in Buffalo and were the parents of at least six children:

- Thomas Hally Bissell (1875–1897), who died unmarried of typhoid fever while attending MIT.
- Mary Eleanor Bissell (1876–1938), who married James Dunlap Warren, son of Orsamus G. Warren, owner of the Buffalo Commercial Advertiser, in 1907.
- Howard Bissell (1878–1937), who married Dorothy Carroll Trego, stepdaughter of Col. Albert B. Hilton, in 1910.
- Raymond Bissell (1880–1926), president of the Cutler Desk Company who married Helen Warren, daughter of Orsamus G. Warren, in 1906.
- Arthur Douglas Bissell Jr. (1884–1968), who married Ella L. (née Benning) Davis.
- Jeanette Bissell (1886–1983), who married Bradley Goodyear, youngest son of Charles W. Goodyear, in 1910.
- Lloyd Bissell (1891–1977), who Dorothy Pendennis White, a daughter of banker and lumberman Pendennis White, in 1916.

His son Raymond predeceased him in February 1926. Bissell died in Buffalo on November 13, 1926.

=== Descendants ===
Through his daughter Jeanette, he was a grandfather of Frances "Fanny" Goodyear (1914–1975), who married Prince Ludwig "Louis" Della Torre e Tasso, son of Prince Alessandro, 1st Duke of Castel Duino in 1939. They divorced in 1948 and she married Daniel Barton Streeter, son of Daniel Willard Streeter, in 1949.
