= Theodore P. Gilman =

American business executive and politician

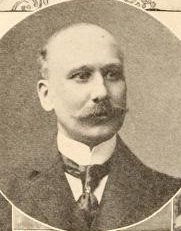
Theodore P. Gilman (1900)

Theodore P. Gilman (1857 – 1922) was an American business executive and politician from New York.

== Life ==
In 1894, he was arrested on a charge of fraud by selling stock of the Port Jervis Brewery of which he had been president, but was then already insolvent and in receivership.

From 1899 to 1900, he was First Deputy Comptroller. After the death of William J. Morgan in September 1900, Gilman was appointed as New York State Comptroller to fill the vacancy until the end of the year. In 1901, he was re-appointed as First Deputy Comptroller, and resigned the post on January 15, 1903, to become President of the General Electric Inspection Company.

He died in 1922.

== Sources ==
Political offices
Preceded by William J. Morgan	New York State Comptroller; 1900	Succeeded by Erastus C. Knight
