= Erastus C. Knight =

American politician

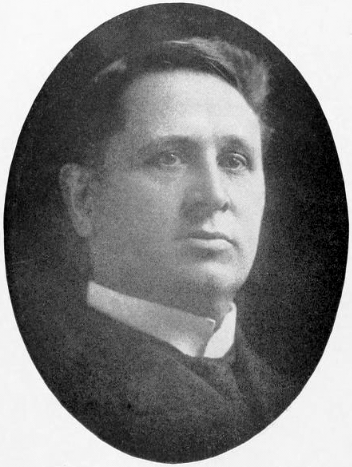

44th Mayor of Buffalo
- In office 1902–1905
- Preceded by: Conrad Diehl
- Succeeded by: James N. Adam

New York State Comptroller
- In office 1901
- Governor: Benjamin B. Odell
- Preceded by: Theodore P. Gilman
- Succeeded by: Nathan L. Miller

Personal details
- Born: March 1, 1857 Buffalo, New York, US
- Died: September 3, 1923 (aged 66) New York City, US
- Resting place: Forest Lawn Cemetery
- Party: Republican
- Spouse: Mary Elizabeth Cowles (m. 1881)
- Children: 6

Erastus Cole Knight (March 1, 1857 – September 3, 1923) was an American businessman and politician.

== Life ==
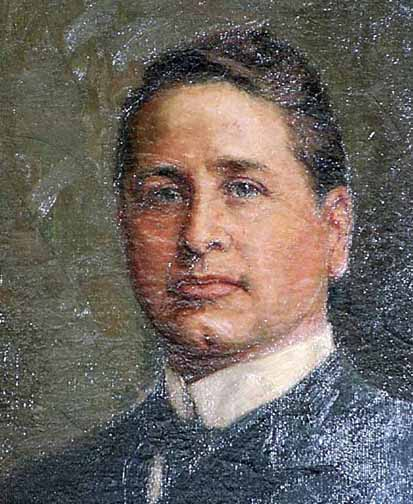
Portrait by Raphael Beck

Erastus C. Knight was born in Buffalo, New York on March 1, 1857. He attended Public School 16 and 14, and graduated from Bryant & Stratton College in Buffalo. Afterwards, he worked for the Bell Brothers wholesale produce house, and went on the road as a salesman for them. The produce business interested Knight and he founded Knight, Lennox & Co. with William C. Lennox in 1880. On May 14, 1881, he married Mary Elizabeth Cowles, and their daughter was Gertrude Knight who married Assemblyman Herbert B. Shonk (1881–1930).

After dissolving the partnership with Lennox in 1887, Knight established a real estate and insurance business. In 1892 he formed with Oliver A. Jenkins the construction company of Jenkins & Knight. Knight was also a partner in the firm Sloan, Cowles & Co., proprietors of excursion steamers and summer resorts.

He entered politics as a Republican and was a supervisor of Buffalo from 1889 to 1894, and was Chairman of the Board of Supervisors in the latter year. He was Buffalo City Comptroller from 1895 to 1900, re-elected in 1898 on the Democratic ticket.

He was New York State Comptroller in 1901, elected after the incumbent William J. Morgan, who had been re-nominated at the Republican state convention, died unexpectedly and Knight was substituted on the ticket. As sitting State Comptroller he ran for Mayor of Buffalo in November 1900, and was elected, serving from 1902 to 1905. He was an alternate delegate to the 1904 Republican National Convention. He did not seek re-election and returned to his private business.

In 1903 he had opened a coal company with his brother George, the E. C. & G. L. Knight Company. In 1905, he organized the Isle of Pines Company, a fruit exporting business, and became its president.

In 1920 he moved to New York City. In August 1923 he fell and broke his hip. He never fully recovered from it, and although surgery was tried, it was unsuccessful. On September 3, 1923, Knight died at his home in the Hotel Pennsylvania, and was buried in Forest Lawn Cemetery, Buffalo.

Party political offices
Preceded by William J. Morgan	Republican nominee for New York State Comptroller; 1900	Succeeded by Nathan L. Miller
Political offices
Preceded by Theodore P. Gilman	New York State Comptroller; 1901	Succeeded by Nathan L. Miller
Preceded by Conrad Diehl	Mayor of Buffalo, NY; 1902–1905	Succeeded by James N. Adam
