= William J. Morgan (New York politician) =

American journalist and politician

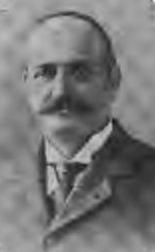
- William J. Morgan, 1897

New York State Comptroller
- In office 1899–1900
- Preceded by: James A. Roberts
- Succeeded by: Theodore P. Gilman

Collector of the Port of Buffalo
- In office 1889–1893
- Appointed by: Benjamin Harrison
- Preceded by: Arthur D. Bissell
- Succeeded by: Peter C. Doyle

Personal details
- Born: October 16, 1840 Peterborough, Upper Canada
- Died: September 5, 1900 (aged 59) Albany, New York

Military service
- Branch/service: Union Army
- Rank: Lieutenant Colonel (bvt)
- Unit: 116th New York Volunteer Infantry
- Battles/wars: American Civil War: • Siege of Port Hudson • Battle of Cedar Creek

William James Morgan (October 16, 1840 – September 5, 1900) was an American newspaper editor and politician.

== Early life ==
Morgan was born on October 16, 1840, in Peterborough, Ontario, Upper Canada.

He came to the United States when 10 years old, and attended the public schools in Buffalo, New York.

== Career ==
At the outbreak of the American Civil War, he enlisted as a private in the 116th New York Volunteer Infantry, and fought in the Siege of Port Hudson and Battle of Cedar Creek. He was several times wounded, and retired in 1864 as a brevet lieutenant colonel of volunteers. Upon his return to Buffalo, he joined the editorial staff of The Buffalo Commercial newspaper in 1869, where he worked for the next 20 years.

=== Political career ===
In 1880, Governor Alonzo B. Cornell appointed him a canal appraiser, and he served as Chairman of the Canal Board. President Benjamin Harrison appointed him Collector of Customs at the Port of Buffalo in 1889, serving until 1893.

In 1894, he was appointed Deputy Comptroller by James A. Roberts, and in 1898 was elected New York State Comptroller to succeed Roberts. He died on the day of his re-nomination by the Republican state convention.

== Personal life ==
In 1869, Morgan married Mary Catherine Reese (1843–1909), a daughter of George Reese and Susannah (née Brower) Reese. Together, they were the parents of three daughters and two sons, including:

- Mabel Morgan (1870–1941), who married Courtland C. Briggs in 1893.
- Morgan, who married William A. Kendall.
- Percy R. Morgan (1878–1961), a lawyer and town supervisor.
- J. Warren Morgan (b. 1880), a civil engineer.
- Mai Morgan, who married attorney Richard H. Templeton in 1908.

Morgan died of heart disease on September 5, 1900, at 1 Main Avenue, his home in Albany, New York. His home in Buffalo was 407 Norwood Avenue. Services in Buffalo were held at the Richmond Avenue Methodist-Episcopal Church with the pall bearers as Secretary of State John T. McDonough, State Engineer Edward A. Bond, Attorney General John C. Davies, State Treasurer John P. Jaeckel, Superintendent of Public Works John Nelson Partridge, Speaker of the Assembly S. Frederick Nixon, Deputy Controller Theodore P. Gilman, Thomas Austin, and Judge D. S. Potter of Glens Falls. His wife died in 1909 at the home of their daughter Mai.

Party political offices
Preceded by James A. Roberts	Republican nominee for New York State Comptroller; 1898	Succeeded by Erastus C. Knight
Political offices
Preceded by James A. Roberts	New York State Comptroller; 1899–1900	Succeeded by Theodore P. Gilman
