= 1920 New York gubernatorial election =

- November 2, 1920
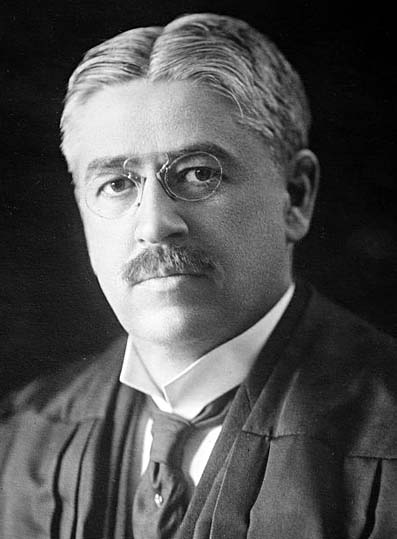

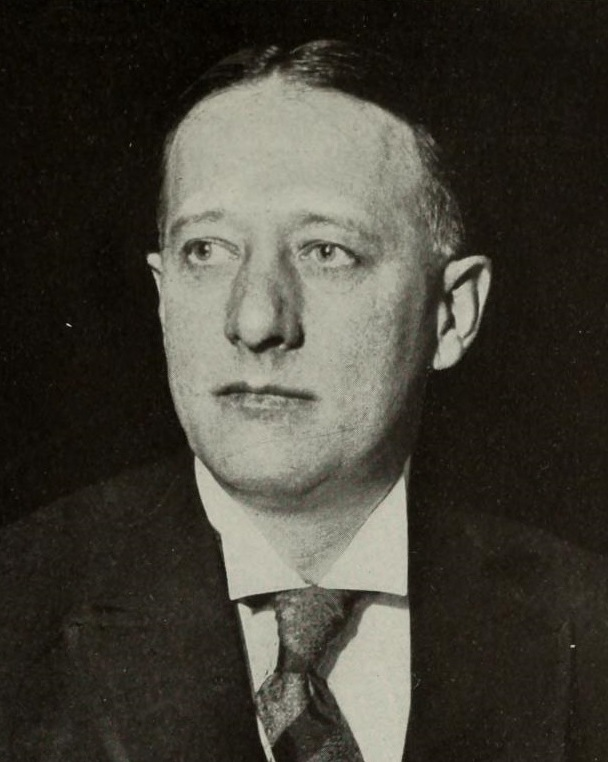

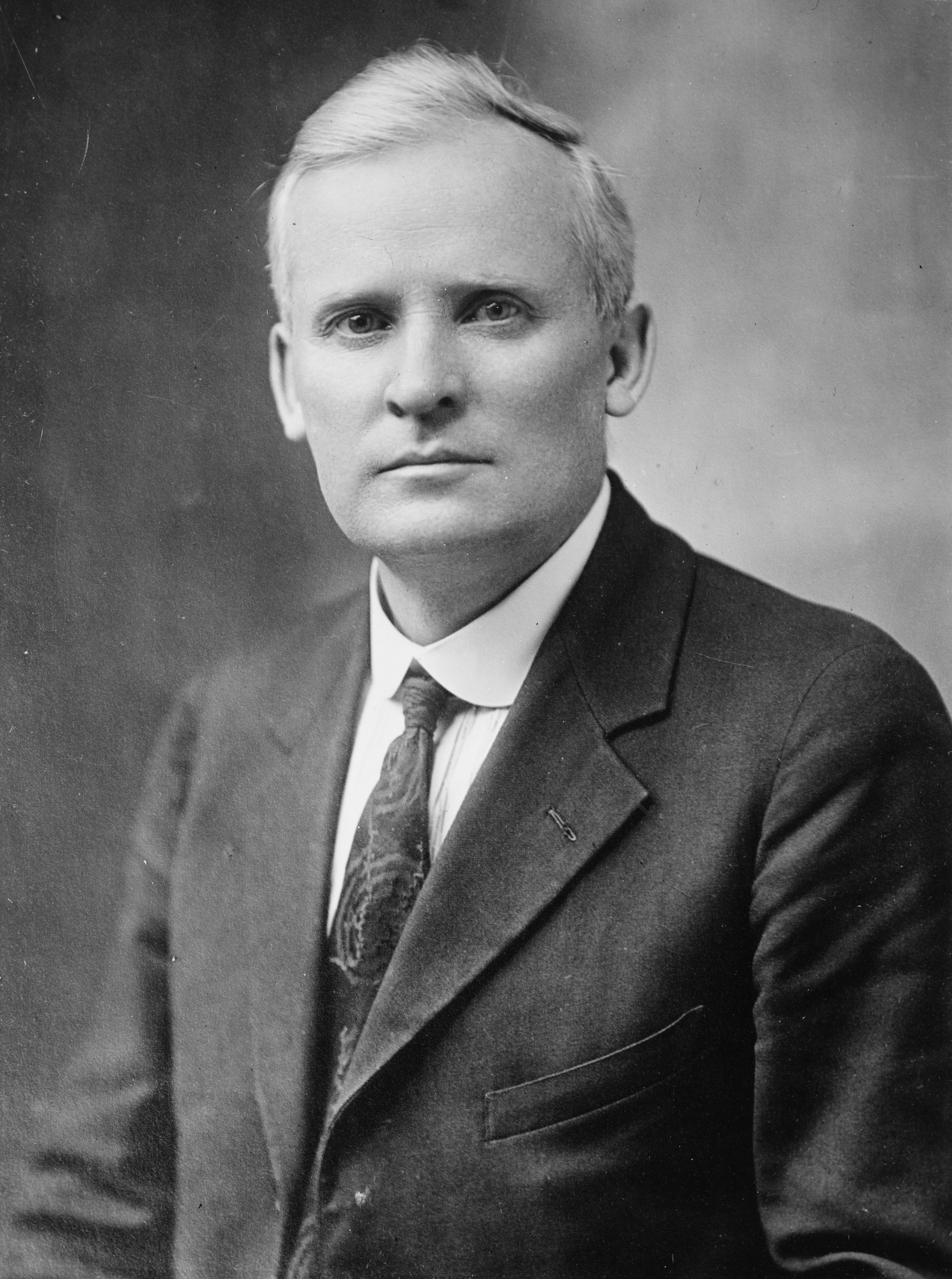
Nominee	Nathan L. Miller	Al Smith	Joseph D. Cannon
Party	Republican	Democratic	Socialist
Popular vote	1,335,878	1,261,812	159,804
Percentage	46.58%	44.00%	5.57%
- County results Miller: 40–50% 50–60% 60–70% 70–80% Smith: 50–60%
Governor before election
Al Smith
Democratic
Elected Governor
Nathan L. Miller
Republican

The 1920 New York gubernatorial election took place on November 2, 1920, to elect the Governor and Lieutenant Governor of New York, concurrently with elections to the United States Senate in other states and elections to the United States House of Representatives and various state and local elections.

Despite losing reelection Al Smith would regain the governorship following his victory in the 1922 New York gubernatorial election and later win the nomination as the Democratic candidate in the 1928 Presidential Election.

== Democratic primary ==
=== Candidates ===
- Al Smith, incumbent Governor

=== Results ===
New York gubernatorial Democratic primary, 1920
Party	Candidate	Votes	%
Democratic	Al Smith (incumbent)	166,628	100.00%
Total votes		166,628	100%

== Republican primary ==
=== Candidates ===
- Nathan L. Miller, State Comptroller
- George F. Thompson, attorney

=== Results ===
New York gubernatorial Republican primary, 1920
Party	Candidate	Votes	%
Republican	Nathan L. Miller	270,963	65.45%
Republican	George F. Thompson	143,040	34.55%
Total votes		414,003	100%

Following his defeat, Thompson ran in the general election as a candidate of the Prohibition Party.

== General election ==
=== Candidates ===
- Joseph D. Cannon (Socialist)
- Dudley Field Malone, attorney and political activist (Farmer-Labor)
- Nathan L. Miller, State Comptroller (Republican)
- Al Smith, incumbent Governor (Democratic)
- George F. Thompson, attorney (Prohibition)

=== Results ===
1920 New York gubernatorial election
Party	Candidate	Votes	%
Republican	Nathan L. Miller	1,335,878	46.58%
Democratic	Al Smith (incumbent)	1,261,812	44.00%
Socialist	Joseph D. Cannon	159,804	5.57%
Farmer-Labor	Dudley Field Malone	69,908	2.44%
Prohibition	George F. Thompson	35,509	1.24%
Socialist Labor	John P. Quinn	5,015	0.17%
Total votes		2,867,926	100%
