= Richard H. Templeton =

American lawyer (1877-1953)

Richard Harkness Templeton (September 23, 1877 – January 18, 1953) was an American lawyer from New York.

== Early life ==
Templeton was born on September 23, 1877, in Buffalo, New York, the son of Thomas Templeton, a contractor and builder, and Charlotte Harkness.

Templeton graduated from the Central High School in 1895. He then attended Syracuse University, graduating from there with an A.B. in 1897. After studying at Buffalo Law School, he studied in the law office of DeWitt Clinton.

== Career ==
Templeton was admitted to the bar in 1901, and continued to work with Clinton until 1906, when he began his own private practice in Buffalo. In 1917, he became a member of the law firm Templeton, Turnbull & Templeton.

In 1925, President Coolidge appointed Templeton United States Attorney for the Western District of New York. He served in that office under Presidents Hoover and Franklin D. Roosevelt; although he was a lifelong Republican, the local Democrats were unable to come up with a successor for the first two years of Roosevelt's presidency. He served as U.S. Attorney until 1934. He also lectured on corporations for the University of Buffalo. He served as a major of the 74th Infantry, New York National Guard.

Templeton was a member of the Erie County Bar Association, the New York State Bar Association, the American Bar Association, Phi Kappa Psi, Phi Delta Phi, and the Freemasons.

== Personal life ==
In 1908, he married Mai Morgan, a daughter of Mary Catherine (née Reese) Morgan and former Collector of the Port of Buffalo William J. Morgan. They had three children, Richard Harkness, Mary Reese, and Jean Morgan.

Templeton died on January 18, 1953. He was buried in Forest Lawn Cemetery in Buffalo.

Legal offices
Preceded by Thomas Penney Jr.	United States Attorney for the Western District of New York; 1925–1934	Succeeded by George L. Grobe
