= Wilson S. Bissell =

American politician (1847–1903)

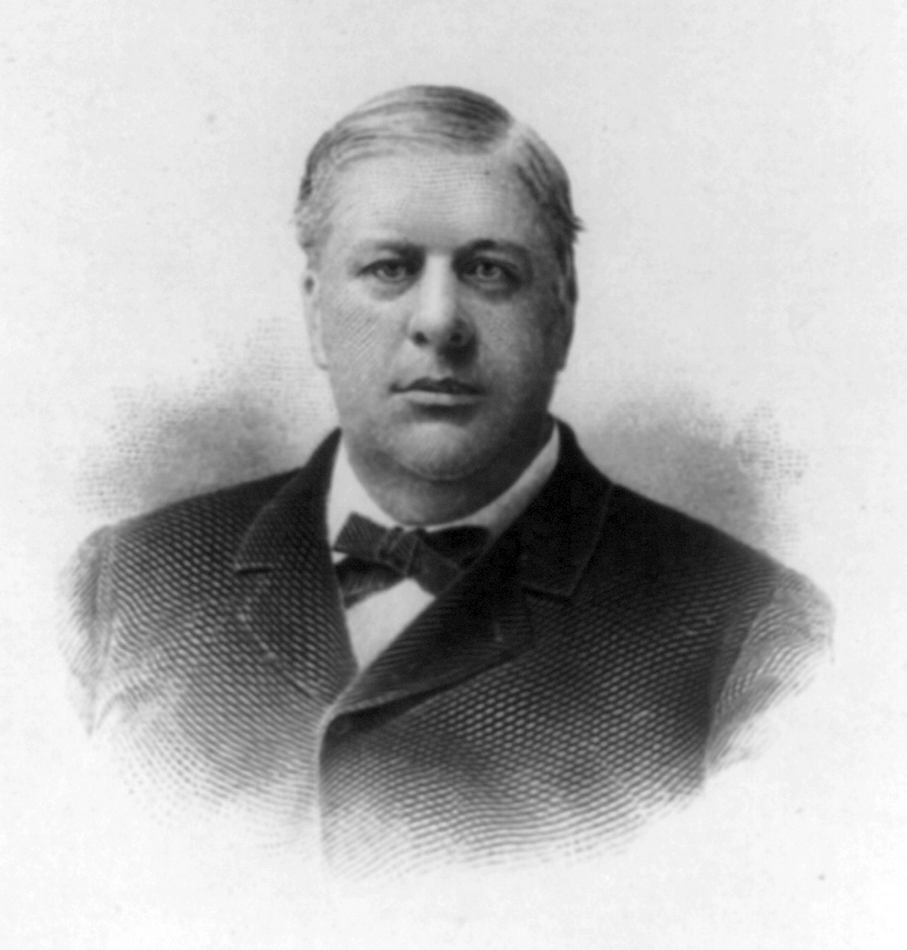

Chancellor of the University of Buffalo
- In office 1902–1903
- Preceded by: James O. Putnam
- Succeeded by: Charles Phelps Norton

36th United States Postmaster General
- In office March 6, 1893 – March 1, 1895
- President: Grover Cleveland
- Preceded by: John Wanamaker
- Succeeded by: William Lyne Wilson

Personal details
- Born: Wilson Shannon Bissell; December 31, 1847 New London, New York, U.S. (now Rome)
- Died: October 6, 1903 (aged 55) Buffalo, New York, U.S.
- Resting place: Forest Lawn Cemetery, Buffalo, New York
- Party: Democratic
- Spouse: Louise Fowler Sturges (m. 1890–1903)
- Relations: Arthur D. Bissell (brother)
- Children: 1
- Education: Yale University (BA)
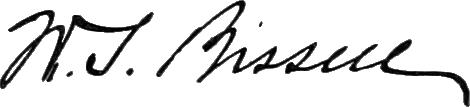
- Signature

Wilson Shannon Bissell (December 31, 1847 – October 6, 1903) was an American politician from New York and considered one of the foremost Democratic leaders of Western New York.

== Early life ==
Bissell was born on December 31, 1847, in Rome, New York. He was the son of John Bissell, a prominent forwarding merchant in Buffalo, and Isabella Jeanette (née Hally) Bissell. His older brother, Arthur D. Bissell, was the president of the New York State Bankers Association and president of the People's Bank of Buffalo. He was of Scotch-Irish ancestry.

He prepared at Hopkins Grammar School in New Haven, Connecticut, and graduated from Yale University in 1869 and was a member of Skull and Bones.

== Career ==
Following his graduation from Yale, he began the study of law in Buffalo with Lanning, Cleveland & Folsom. He was admitted to the bar in 1871 and began practicing.

From 1873 to 1882 he was a law partner of future President Grover Cleveland and acted as chief groomsman when Cleveland was married. Bissell entered Democratic Party politics as a candidate for presidential elector in 1888. He served as Postmaster General under Cleveland from 1893 to 1895. In 1896, he was a delegate to the 1896 Democratic National Convention.

Apgar's Corners in Tewksbury Township, New Jersey, was renamed in 1893 to the village of Bissell in an effort to sway him into ordering that a post office be created in the settlement. A small post office building (no longer in existence) was established soon thereafter.

From 1902 until his death in 1903, Bissell served as the Chancellor of the University of Buffalo.

== Personal life ==
On February 6, 1890, Bissell married Louise Fowler Sturges of Geneva, New York. They were the parents of one child.

Bissell died at age 55 on October 6, 1903, at his residence in Buffalo, New York. After a funeral at Trinity Episcopal Church in Buffalo (where former President Cleveland was a pallbearer), his body was cremated and his ashes were buried in the family lot at Forest Lawn Cemetery, Buffalo.

Political offices
Preceded by John Wanamaker	United States Postmaster General; Served under: Grover Cleveland; 1893–1895	Succeeded by William Lyne Wilson
