= Betty Bailey =

Betty Bailey may refer to:

- Betty G. Bailey (1939–2019), American artist
- Betty Lou Bailey (1929–2007), American mechanical engineer

== See also ==
- Elizabeth Bailey (disambiguation)
