= Nathan L. Miller =

American politician (1868–1953)

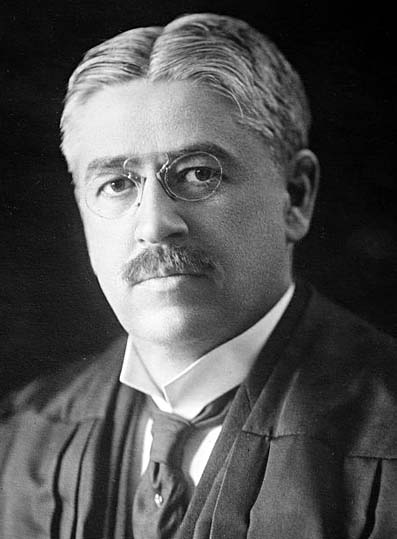

43rd Governor of New York
- In office January 1, 1921 – December 31, 1922
- Lieutenant: Jeremiah Wood
- Preceded by: Al Smith
- Succeeded by: Al Smith

President of the New York State Bar Association
- In office January 17, 1920 – January 22, 1921
- Preceded by: Henry Waters Taft
- Succeeded by: William D. Guthrie

Associate Judge of the New York Court of Appeals
- In office January 7, 1913 – August 1, 1915
- Preceded by: None (original vacancy)
- Succeeded by: Cuthbert W. Pound

36th Comptroller of New York
- In office December 30, 1901 – November 8, 1903
- Governor: Benjamin Odell
- Preceded by: Erastus C. Knight
- Succeeded by: Otto Kelsey

Personal details
- Born: Nathan Lewis Miller; October 10, 1868 Solon, New York, U.S.
- Died: June 26, 1953 (aged 84) New York City, New York, U.S.
- Resting place: Cortland Rural Cemetery
- Party: Republican
- Spouse: Elizabeth Davern (m. 1896)
- Children: 7
- Education: Cortland Normal School (BA)

Nathan Lewis Miller (10 October 1868 – 26 June 1953) was an American attorney and politician from New York. A Republican, he served as New York State Comptroller from 1901 to 1903, and a judge of the New York Supreme Court and New York Court of Appeals from 1903 to 1915. From 1921 to 1922, he served as governor of New York.

A native of Solon, New York. Miller graduated from the Cortland Normal School in 1887, taught school for several years while studying law with a Cortland attorney and attained admission to the bar in 1893. He also became active in politics when he began giving campaign speeches on behalf of Cortland County's Republican Committee.

Miller served as a school commissioner in Cortland County from 1894 to 1900 and was the city of Cortland's corporation counsel from 1901 to 1902. In 1901 he was appointed New York State Comptroller following the resignation of the incumbent, and he served until 1903. In 1903, he was appointed a justice of the New York Supreme Court, and in 1905 he was designated to serve as a justice of the court's appellate division. In 1913, he was appointed to the New York Court of Appeals, where he served until 1915.

In August 1915, Miller resigned his judgeship to return to practicing law, and he established a practice in Syracuse. In 1920, he was the successful Republican nominee for governor, and he served one term, 1921 to 1922. Miller prioritized cost-cutting during his term, and enacted reforms including ending the monopoly caused by the state's selection of a single firm as its official printer. Miller was defeated for reelection in 1922. After leaving office, Miller practiced law in New York City with the firm that became Willkie Farr & Gallagher. In addition, he served as general counsel, a director, and a finance committee member of United States Steel. He died at The Pierre hotel in New York City on 26 June 1953 and was buried at Cortland Rural Cemetery.

== Early life ==
Nathan Lewis Miller was born in Solon, New York on 10 October 1868, a son of farmer Samuel Miller and Almera (Russell) Miller. The Samuel Miller family moved to a farm near Groton in 1872 and then to one near Cortland in 1881. Nathan Miller attended the local schools of Groton and Cortland and graduated from the Groton Union School in 1883. He then attended the Cortland Normal School, from which he graduated in 1887. While attending the normal school, Miller joined the Gamma Sigma fraternity. After completing his education, Miller taught school in towns near Cortland from 1887 to 1893.

In 1890, Miller began to study law at the Cortland firm of Smith & Dickinson. He attained admission to the bar in 1893 and began to practice in Cortland. In 1899, he joined James F. Dougherty in the firm of Dougherty and Miller. Miller also became active in politics and local government as a Republican; in addition to making campaign speeches for the Cortland County Republican Committee, he served as a county school commissioner from 1894 to 1900 and was elected chairman of the county Republican committee in 1898. From 1901 to 1902, he served as the city of Cortland's corporation counsel.

=== Marriage ===
On November 23, 1896, Miller married Elizabeth Davern, a schoolteacher and principal from Marathon, New York. They were married until his death, and were the parents of seven daughters, including Mildred, Marian, Margaret, Elizabeth, Louise, Eleanor, and Constance.

== Continued career ==
In December 1901, Erastus C. Knight, the incumbent New York State Comptroller, resigned after winning election as mayor of Buffalo. Governor Benjamin B. Odell appointed Miller to fill the vacancy. He was elected to a full term in 1902 and served until November 1903, when he resigned in order to accept a judicial appointment.

Miller left the state comptroller's post when Odell selected him to serve as a justice of the New York Supreme Court's sixth district, which included Cortland County. In 1905, Miller was designated for service on the court's appellate division; he served on the bench of the second department until 1910, and the first department from 1910 to 1913. In January 1913, Governor William Sulzer appointed Miller a judge of the New York Court of Appeals; he served until August 1915, when he resigned so he could resume the practice of law.

One of Miller's best known opinions was 1915's Matter of Jensen v. Southern Pacific Co. In this ruling, the court held that the family of a New York City stevedore who died after he fell off a gangway while unloading a cargo ship was entitled to compensation from his employer under state law. His employer, the Southern Pacific Company, objected, arguing that the stevedore was engaged in interstate commerce, so state jurisdiction did not apply. The U.S. Supreme Court overturned the state ruling, but in 1917 the U.S. Congress enacted legislation that allowed the families of maritime workers injured or killed while engaged in interstate commerce to seek compensation under state laws.

After leaving the bench, Miller moved to Syracuse, where he practiced corporate law and served as counsel for the Solvay Process Company. He also resumed his involvement in Republican politics, including serving as a member of the state party's executive committee. In January 1920, Miller was elected president of the New York State Bar Association. Later that month, he disclaimed interest in the Republican nomination for governor in that year's election. He was a delegate to the 1920 Republican National Convention, where he made the nominating speech for Herbert Hoover.

== Governor ==
Despite his demurrals, state Republican leaders continued to promote Miller's candidacy for governor in the 1920 election. Other prospective candidates, including Charles F. Thompson and Francis Hugo, opposed Miller as being too closely aligned with corporate interests and the party's leadership. Miller agreed to accept the nomination and was the choice of the delegates at the party's July convention. Thompson and Miller then competed in the state's September primary election; Miller won the gubernatorial nomination with 65 percent of the vote, though Thompson remained on the ballot as the nominee of the Prohibition Party. In the November general election, Miller defeated incumbent Al Smith in that year's Republican wave, receiving 47 percent of the vote to Smith's 44.

Miller had argued against Prohibition as a federal encroachment on state power, but once the Eighteenth Amendment to the United States Constitution was enacted, he supported enforcement on the grounds that obeying the law, even an unpopular one, took priority. He opposed much socially progressive legislation as paternalistic and opposed U.S. involvement in the League of Nations on the grounds that an isolationist foreign policy would prevent U.S. involvement in future wars. During his term as governor, he pursued some progressive measures, including health clinics for children, an expanded use of executive clemency for state prison inmates, and an end to the de facto monopoly caused by the designation of an official state printer.

Despite his support for some progressive initiatives, Miller's term was concerned primarily with cost cutting and economy. To that end, he eliminated state jobs he considered superfluous or unnecessary, restructured the state department of labor and public service commission, and created a single department to handle state government purchasing. To demonstrate his personal commitment to reducing state expenditures, Miller paid personally for repairs to and maintenance of the New York State Executive Mansion.

Miller campaigned for a second term in 1922 and continued to prioritize cost cutting as his primary theme. However, his focus on reduced state expenditures proved to be unpopular, and Smith handily won their rematch. Near the end of his term, Miller was informed that U.S. Chief Justice William Howard Taft intended to recommend him to President Warren G. Harding for appointment to the U.S. Supreme Court. He declined to be considered because he had already made plans to move to New York City to practice law.

== Later career ==
After the end of his term, Miller and Harold Otis formed the Miller & Otis law partnership; in 1931, their firm merged with another New York City partnership, Hornblower, Miller & Garrison. This firm later became Willkie Farr & Gallagher, which has continued to be active in the field of corporation law. From 1925 until his death, Miller served as general counsel, member of the board of directors, and finance committee member for United States Steel. In 1939, he left Hornblower, Miller & Garrison so he could focus solely on his work for U.S. Steel. In 1952, U.S. Steel was one of the companies that prevailed in Youngstown Sheet & Tube Co. v. Sawyer, a landmark U.S. Supreme Court case. Miller participated in authoring the company's brief, and the court's ruling limited the power of the president to seize private property.

In January 1952, Miller was the first recipient of the New York State Bar Association’s Gold Medal for Distinguished Service. He also received the honorary degree of LL.D. from Columbia University, Syracuse University, Colgate University, and Union College. Beginning in the mid-1930s, Miller maintained a summer home in Oyster Bay while residing at The Pierre hotel in New York City. In May 1953, Miller broke his hip after a fall. Health complications including pneumonia soon followed, and he died at The Pierre on 26 June 1953. Miller was buried at Cortland Rural Cemetery in Cortland.

Party political offices
Preceded by Erastus C. Knight	Republican nominee for Comptroller of New York; 1902	Succeeded by Otto Kelsey
Preceded by Charles S. Whitman	Republican nominee for Governor of New York; 1920, 1922	Succeeded by Theodore Roosevelt Jr.
Political offices
Preceded by Erastus C. Knight	Comptroller of New York; 1901–1902	Succeeded by Otto Kelsey
Preceded by Al Smith	Governor of New York; 1921–1922	Succeeded by Al Smith
