= Beth Bailey (historian) =

American historian

Beth Bailey is an American historian who writes about U.S. military history and the history of gender and sexuality.

Bailey is currently a Foundation Distinguished Professor at the University of Kansas, where she teaches in the department of history and directs the Center for Military, War, and Society Studies, which she founded in 2015.

== Biography ==
Bailey was born in Atlanta on December 29, 1957, and raised in Smyrna, Georgia. In high school, she was first clarinetist in the Atlanta Symphony Youth Orchestra and a member of the Emory Wind Ensemble. She attended Northwestern University, graduating in 1979 with a B.A. in the American Culture Program. Bailey received her M.A. (1982) and PhD (1986) in U.S. history from the University of Chicago.

Following visiting positions at the University of Hawaiʻi and the University of Kansas, she taught at Barnard College, Columbia University (1989-1997); the University of New Mexico (1997-2004); Temple University (2004-2015), and the University of Kansas (2015–present).

Bailey is married to historian David Farber, with whom she often collaborates. They have one son.

== Awards ==
Bailey’s research has been supported by the National Endowment for the Humanities, the Woodrow Wilson International Center for Scholars, and the American Council of Learned Societies, and she has twice received the Army Historical Foundation Distinguished Writing Award.

Bailey was elected to the Society of American Historians in 2017, and has given talks or been a visiting scholar in Australia, China, France, Germany, Indonesia, Japan, Lebanon, the Netherlands, Russia, Saudi Arabia, and the United Kingdom.

== Publications ==
=== Selected works ===
- Beth Bailey (2009). America's Army: Making the All-Volunteer Force. Cambridge, Mass: Harvard University Press. ISBN 9780674035362. OCLC 316037930.
- Beth Bailey (2002). Sex in the Heartland. Harvard University Press. ISBN 0674009746. OCLC 52548417.
- Beth Bailey; David R. Farber (1994). The First Strange Place: Race and Sex in World War II Hawaii. Baltimore: Johns Hopkins University Press. ISBN 0801848679. OCLC 29637751.
- Beth Bailey (1993). From Front Porch to Back Seat: Courtship in Twentieth-Century America. Baltimore: Johns Hopkins University Press. ISBN 0801836093. OCLC 613632266.

=== Edited works ===
- Beth Bailey; Kara Vuic; Alesha Doan; Shannon Portillo, eds. (2022). Managing Sex in the U.S. Military. University of Nebraska Press.
- Beth Bailey; David Farber, eds. (2019). Beyond Pearl Harbor: A Pacific History. University Press of Kansas.
- Beth Bailey; Richard H. Immerman, eds. (2015). Understanding the U.S. Wars in Iraq and Afghanistan. NYU Press. ISBN 9781479871438. OCLC 904861997.
- Beth Bailey; David R. Farber (2004). America in the Seventies. University Press of Kansas. ISBN 0700613269. OCLC 54372427.

=== Syntheses, texts, and readers ===
- Beth Bailey; Mary Beth Norton; et al., eds. (December 2017). A People and a Nation (11 ed.). Cengage.
- Beth Bailey; William Chafe; Harvard Sitkoff, eds. (2011). A History of Our Time (8 ed.). Oxford University Press.
- Beth Bailey; David Farber (January 2006). The Fifties Chronicle. Chicago: Publications International.
- Beth Bailey; David Farber, eds. (2003). The Columbia Guide to America in the 1960s. Columbia University Press.

=== Series editor ===
Bailey is the co-editor of the Military, War, and Society in Modern U.S. History series with Andrew Preston, at the University of Cambridge, Cambridge University Press, founded in 2017.
