= Daniel O'Day =

American businessman

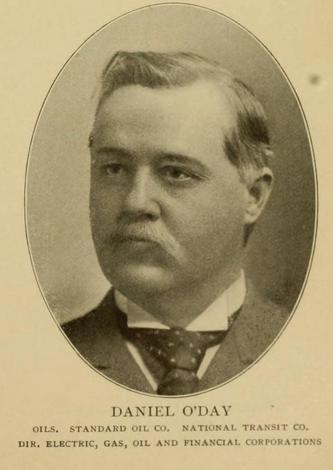
Daniel O'Day

Daniel O'Day Jr. (March 11, 1870 – May 31, 1916) was one of northwestern Pennsylvania's earliest independent refiners to be brought into John D. Rockefeller's Standard Oil Company.

== Early life ==
O'Day was born on March 11, 1870, in Titusville, Pennsylvania. His father, Daniel O'Day, was a director of the Standard Oil Company and a prominent factor in the petroleum business for forty years. He died during a trip to France due to an arterial hemorrhage possibly caused by overwork. Daniel O'Day Sr. was the close personal friend of John D. Rockefeller; he was said to be the master mind on the transportation end of the Standard's scheme for monopolizing the oil business of the country at a time when the opposition of the independent petroleum companies was at its height. O'Day Sr. had retired from active participation in Standard Oil's affairs during 1905; his place in the business was largely taken by his son, Daniel O'Day Jr., who was trained to succeed him.

== Career ==
O'Day also led installation of massive spans of pipeline that brought crude from the oil fields to refiners along the Eastern Seaboard, making it easier to refine crude for shipment to markets in Europe.

O'Day would eventually manage crews that laid pipe to bring oil from wells to the railroads. Despite attempts by many Standard Oil critics/enemies to sabotage the pipelines, O'Day's crews were skilled and efficient enough to lay pipe faster than it could be destroyed. This effectively ended the days of rolling wooden barrels of oil across the country to rail hubs, a service for which Standard might be hustled out of as much as $3 at a time when the oil itself was worth $1.25.

== Personal life ==
In 1901, he married future Democratic politician Caroline Love Goodwin in New York and remained married until his death.

O'Day died on May 31, 1916, at his home on Highland Avenue in Rye, New York. He left an estate worth over $500,000, and his beneficiaries under the will were his widow Caroline and their three children, Ella W. O'Day, Daniel O'Day III, and Charles O'Day. His widow received a life interest in all the estate, which the children inherited after her death.
