= Dan O'Day =

American football quarterback and coach

Biographical details
- Died: 1953

Playing career
- 1887–1888: Georgetown
- Position: Quarterback

Coaching career (HC unless noted)
- 1888: Georgetown

Daniel E. O'Day (died 1953) was an American college football player and coach. He served as a player-coach at Georgetown University in Washington, D.C. in 1888. O'Day was the starting quarterback for the Hoyas in 1887 and 1888.
