= Daniel O'Day (banker) =

American businessman

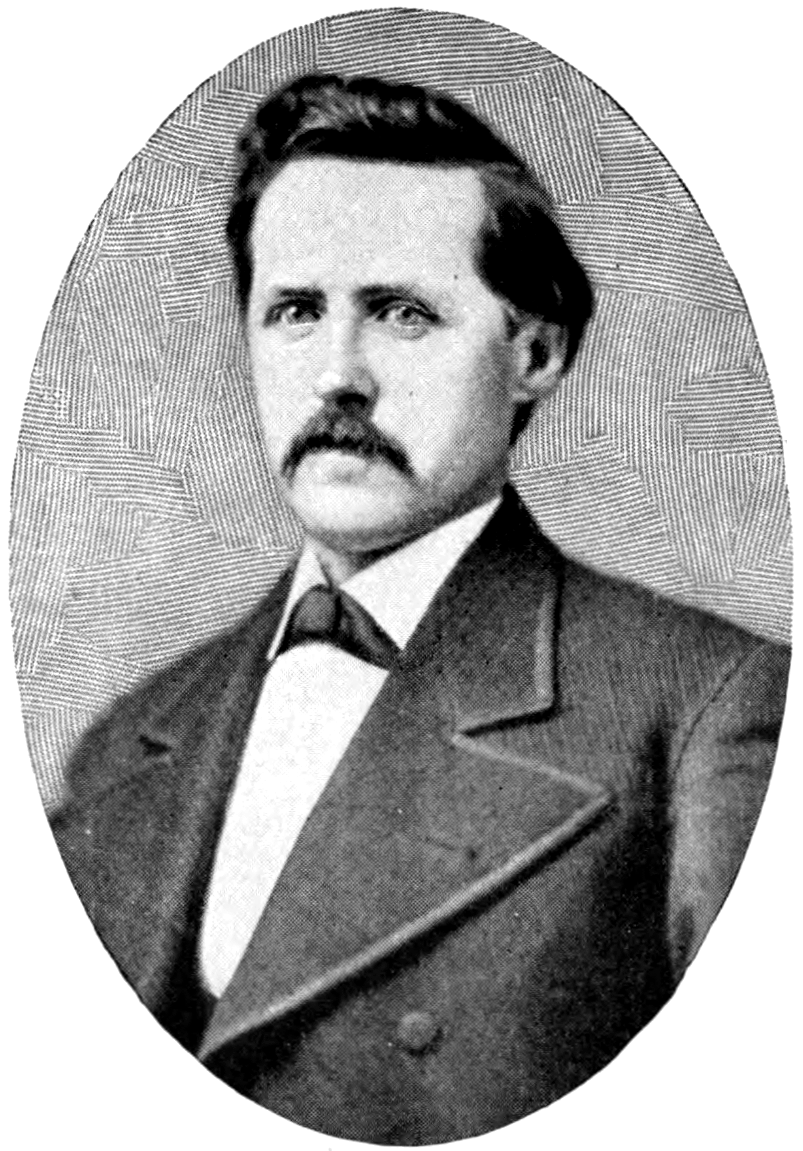
- Daniel O'Day in 1872

President of the People's Bank of Buffalo
- In office 1889–1906
- Preceded by: Inaugural holder
- Succeeded by: Arthur D. Bissell

Personal details
- Born: February 6, 1844 County Clare, Ireland
- Died: September 13, 1906 (aged 62) Royan, France
- Spouse: Louise Newell
- Children: 11, including Daniel Jr.
- Known for: Director of Standard Oil

Daniel O'Day (February 6, 1844 – September 13, 1906) was an Irish-American banker who was a close personal friend of John D. Rockefeller.

== Early life ==
O'Day was born on February 6, 1844, in County Clare, Ireland, the son of Michael and Mary O'Day. His father brought the family to America in 1845, settling on a farm in Cattaraugus County, New York, where he grew up and received his education.

== Career ==
He attended the public schools in Buffalo before beginning his business career in the freight yards there. After four years in Buffalo, he went to the oil regions of Pennsylvania, then in its infancy. In 1870, he became custodian of Bostwick & Tilford, which was involved in the Southern Improvement Company. He was one of five original men who organized the Standard Oil Company. In 1873, O'Day began constructing pipelines of his own, of which the first was the American Transfer Line which ran from Emlenton to the producing fields of Clarion County. These consolidated into the United Pipe Lines System which became the National Transit Company, of which he was an executive until his death when he was serving as vice president. He was also instrumental in the construction of the first pipe lines from the oil fields into New York City. In 1884, he became one of the organizers and president of the Northwestern Ohio Natural Gas Company, capitalized at $6,000,000. O'Day retired from active participation in Standard Oil's affairs during 1905 and his place was largely taken by his son, Daniel Jr.

He served as president of the People's Bank of Buffalo and was a director of the Atlantic Coast Realty Co., the Buffalo General Electric Co., the Buffalo Natural Gas Co., the Seaboard National Bank of New York, the Brooklyn Dock and Terminal Co., the Buffalo, Thousand Islands and Portland Railroad Co., the Cataract Power and Conduit Co., the Colonial Safe Deposit Co., and the Colonial Trust Co. of New York.

=== Philanthropy ===
O'Day donated $10,000 towards the $30,000 construction cost of St. Mary's, a Roman Catholic church in Deal, New Jersey, near his country estate.

== Personal life ==
O'Day was married to Louise Newell (d. 1891), a daughter of Anthony H. Newell and Delia (née Burke) Newell. Together, they lived at 128 West 72nd Street and were the parents of eleven children, including:

- Daniel O'Day Jr. (1870–1916), who married Caroline Love Goodwin, daughter of Sidney Prior Goodwin, in 1901.
- Florence O'Day (1883–1983), who married John William Hallahan III in 1906.
- Ruth O'Day (1887–1969), a writer who married William Butler Boyd. After his death in 1933, she married publisher Victor Frank Ridder.
- Geraldine O'Day (1889–1908), who died unmarried.
- Dorothy O'Day (1891–1957), who married John Howard Sheble Jr. in 1915.
- John O'Day (1893–1948), who fought in World War II.

O'Day died on September 13, 1906, while on vacation in Royan, France, due to an arterial hemorrhage, likely caused by overwork. His funeral was held at the Church of the Blessed Sacrament in Manhattan and was attended by John D. Rockefeller, his son, John D. Rockefeller Jr., and several Standard Oil company officials.
