= Joseph Cannon (socialist) =

American union organizer and politician

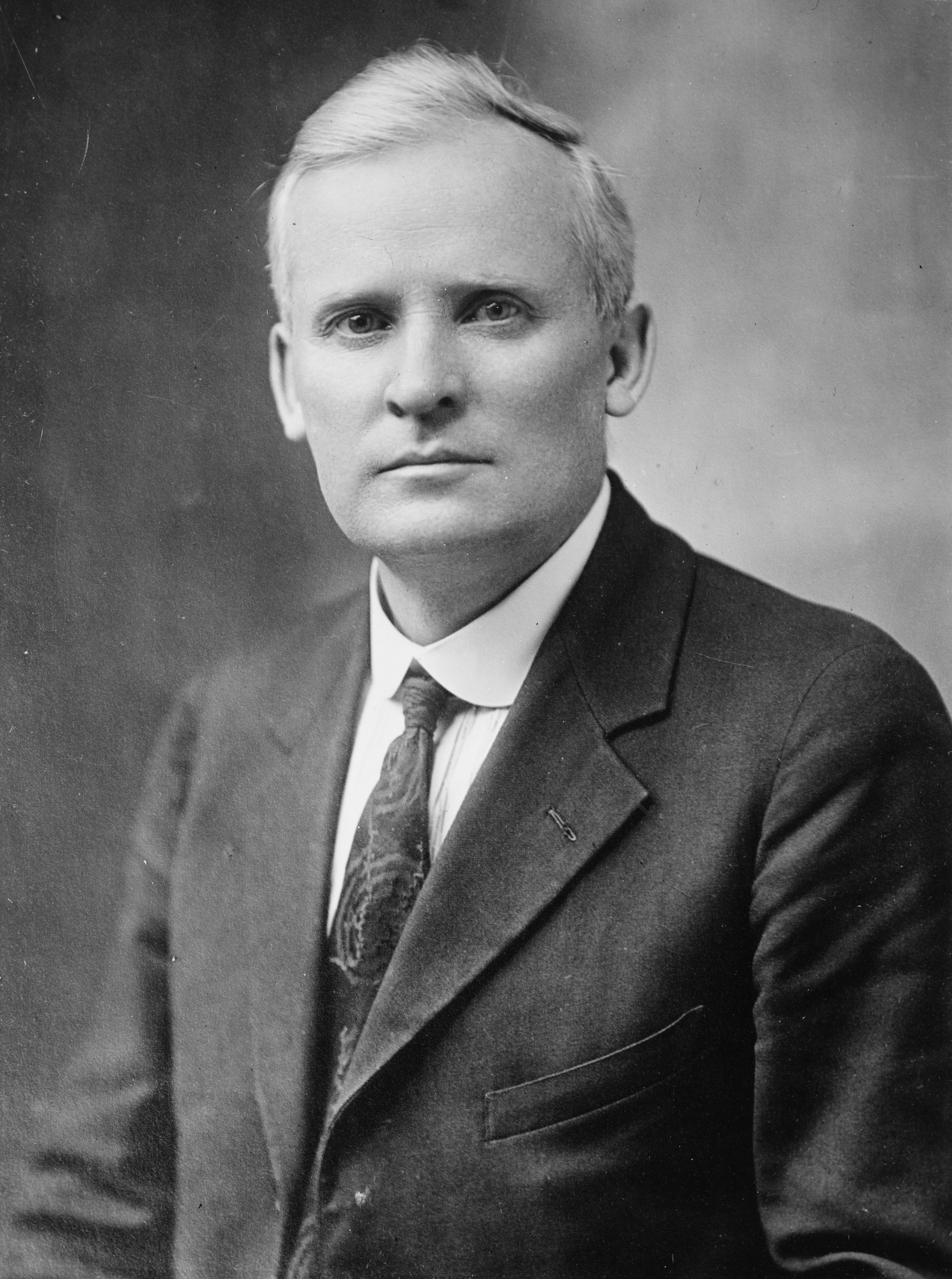
Cannon c. 1915–1920

Joseph D. Cannon (October 26, 1871 – January 4, 1952) was an American union organizer and politician from New York.

== Life ==
In 1910 Cannon was living in Arizona and was the leader of Arizona's Western Federation of Miners. During the summer of 1910 he met and married Laura Gregg Cannon, a lecturer and organizer in the women's suffrage movement.

Cannon was an organizer for the Metal Workers' Union in New York.

He ran on the ticket of the Socialist Party of America for U.S. Senator from New York in 1916; for the Board of Aldermen from the 22nd Ward in 1919; for Governor of New York in 1920; for the New York State Senate (18th District) in 1922; and for the U.S. House of Representatives from New York's 19th congressional district in 1926.

During the party split of 1919, Cannon was a supporter of the Regular faction of National Executive Secretary Adolph Germer and NEC members James Oneal and Morris Hillquit.

Cannon later served as CIO regional director in Kentucky.
