= David Farber (historian) =

American historian

Academic background
- Education: University of Michigan, University of Chicago

Academic work
- Discipline: History
- Institutions: Barnard College, University of Hawaii, University of New Mexico, Temple University, University of Kansas

David Farber is an American historian. He is the Roy A. Roberts Distinguished Professor of History at the University of Kansas.

== Life ==
He received a BA from the University of Michigan, and earned a Ph.D. in American history from the University of Chicago. He has also taught at Barnard College, the University of Hawaii, the University of New Mexico, and Temple University. His research encompasses twentieth-century American history, especially the second half of the century.

== Bibliography ==
- With Beth Bailey. The First Strange Place: The Alchemy of Sex and Race in WWII Hawaii Johns Hopkins University Press. 1992
- Chicago '68. University of Chicago Press. 1994. ISBN 9780226237992.
- The Age of Great Dreams: America in the 1960s. Farrar, Straus and Giroux. 1994. ISBN 9781429931267.
- Sloan Rules: Alfred P. Sloan and the Triumph of General Motors University of Chicago Press. 2002
- Taken Hostage: The Iran Hostage Crisis and America's First Encounter with Radical Islam. Princeton University Press. 2009. ISBN 978-1400826209.
- The Sixties: From Memory to History. UNC Press Books. 2012. ISBN 9781469608730.
- The Rise and Fall of Modern American Conservatism: A Short History. Princeton University Press. 2012. ISBN 978-1400834297.
- Everybody Ought to Be Rich: The Life and Times of John J. Raskob, Capitalist. Oxford University Press. 2013. ISBN 9780199911622
- Crack: Rock Cocaine, Street Capitalism, and the Decade of Greed Cambridge University Press. 2019. ISBN 9781108425278
