= Major Andre Andrews =

American politician

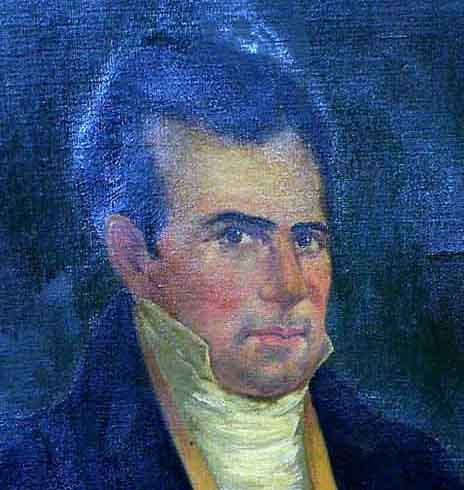
- Portrait of Major A. Andrews

2nd Mayor of Buffalo
- In office 1833–1834
- Preceded by: Ebenezer Johnson
- Succeeded by: Ebenezer Johnson

Personal details
- Born: July 8, 1792 Cornwall, Connecticut
- Died: August 18, 1834 (aged 42) Buffalo, New York
- Spouse: Sarah Mehitabel Hosmer
- Children: eight children

Major Andre Andrews (1792–1834) was the second mayor of Buffalo, New York, serving 1833–1834. He was born at Cornwall, Connecticut on July 8, 1792, and named after Major John André. He studied law and became a lawyer, practicing in Middletown, Connecticut before moving to Buffalo about 1820. While at Middleton, he married Sarah Mehitabel Hosmer, granddaughter of General Samuel Holden Parsons. He amassed a 79-acre (32 ha) property on which he built his home. His residence was located on the site now occupied by the Electric Tower.

In 1826 he was elected to his first political position as a trustee of the Village of Buffalo. He held this position again in 1827. In 1829 he campaigned unsuccessfully, for a seat on the New York State Assembly. In 1830, he became a founding member of the first Bank of Buffalo, along with Benjamin Rathbun, Hiram Pratt, and William Ketchum, the latter two future mayors of Buffalo. During Mayor Johnson's first term, Andrews served on the Streets, Alleys, Canals and Ferries committee and the Police committee.

In 1833, the Common Council voted Major Andre Andrews Buffalo's second mayor. In 1834, cholera returned to Buffalo and, on August 18, 1834, claimed Mayor Andrews. Andrews is buried in Forest Lawn Cemetery.

Political offices
Preceded by Ebenezer Johnson	Mayor of Buffalo, NY; 1833–1834	Succeeded by Ebenezer Johnson
