= Morals clause =

Contractual provision

A morality clause (also known as a morals clause, bad boy clause or bad girl clause) is a provision within a contract which curtails, restrains, or proscribes certain behavior of parties to the contract.

A morality clause is used as a means of holding the parties to a certain behavioral standard so as not to bring disrepute, contempt or scandal to other individuals or parties to the contract and their interests. It attempts to preserve a public and private image of such a party to the contract. In essence, one party to the contract is purchasing the other party's good name or reputation. These clauses are most seen in contracts between actors and their studios, the field of education (especially minors), athletes and their organization or proprietors of a product that the athletes may endorse or as a part of a marital settlement. Commonly proscribed activities include the use or abuse of alcohol, the use of illegal drugs or narcotics or illegal or illicit sexual activity, but many morality clauses are written vaguely.

== Background ==
The impetus for a morals clause in contracts for "talent" (i.e., artistic performers) appears to have been a reaction to the Roscoe "Fatty" Arbuckle case in 1921. Subsequent to media outcry, Universal Studios decided to add a morals clause to its contracts with performers. The text of the 1921 Universal Studios clause read as follows: "The actor (actress) agrees to conduct himself (herself) with due regard to public conventions and morals and agrees that he (she) will not do or commit anything tending to degrade him (her) in society or bring him (her) into public hatred, contempt, scorn or ridicule, or tending to shock, insult or offend the community or outrage public morals or decency, or tending to the prejudice of the Universal Film Manufacturing Company or the motion picture industry. In the event that the actor (actress) violates any term or provision of this paragraph, then the Universal Film Manufacturing Company has the right to cancel and annul this contract by giving five (5) days' notice to the actor (actress) of its intention to do so."

The first morals clause for a professional athlete may be a November 11, 1922 contract addendum for Babe Ruth. The clause stated:

It is understood and agreed by and between the parties hereto that the regulation above set forth, numbered "2" shall be construed to mean among other things, that the player shall at all times during the term of this contract and throughout the years 1922, 1923 and 1924, and the years 1925 and 1926 if this contract is renewed for such years, refrain and abstain entirely from the use of intoxicating liquors and that he shall not during the training and playing season in each year stay up later than 1 o'clock A.M. on any day without the permission and consent of the Club's manager, and it is understood and agreed that if at any time during the period of this contract, whether in the playing season or not, the player shall indulge in intoxicating liquors or be guilty of any action or misbehavior which may render him unfit to perform the services to be performed by him hereunder, the Club may cancel and terminate this contract and retain as the property of the Club, any sums of money withheld from the player's salary as above provided.

Apparently, Colonel Jake Ruppert (owner of the Yankees) had also hoped to curtail Babe's notorious womanizing. Ruth is quoted as replying, "I'll promise to go easier on drinking and to get to bed earlier, but not for you, fifty thousand dollars, or two-hundred and fifty thousand dollars will I give up women. They're too much fun."

== 21st century use ==
In the 21st Century, morals clauses still exist widely for athletes, and in fact, may be invoked more quickly than in the past, as in the case of Ryan Lochte.

== See also ==
- Endorsement (disambiguation)
- Entertainment law
- Moral turpitude
- Personality rights
