= Charles E. Roesch =

American politician (1886–1936)

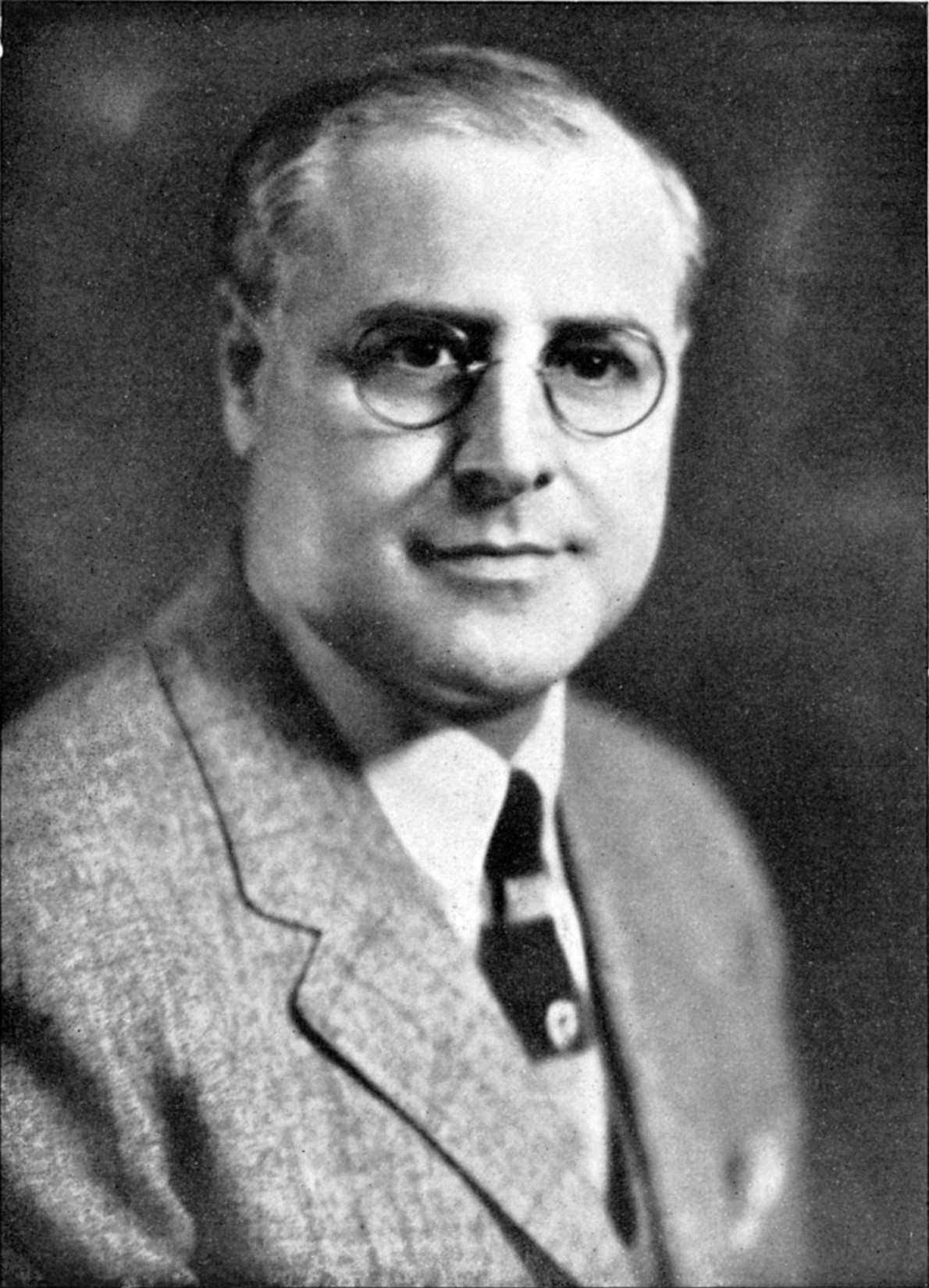

49th Mayor of Buffalo
- In office 1930–1933
- Preceded by: Frank X. Schwab
- Succeeded by: George J. Zimmermann

Personal details
- Born: March 31, 1886 Buffalo, New York
- Died: January 15, 1936 (aged 49) Buffalo, New York
- Party: Republican
- Spouse: Mabel C. Klinck
- Children: 2

Charles Edward Roesch (March 31, 1886 – January 15, 1936) was Mayor of the City of Buffalo, New York, serving from 1930 until 1933. He was born in Buffalo at 613 Oak Street on March 31, 1886, the son of a leading local meatpacker. He graduated from Public School No. 15 in June, 1901, and he joined his father in his wholesale and retail meat business in the Chippewa Market. In 1914, he started his own meat business at the Broadway Market. He married Mabel C. Klinck on June 3, 1914; her uncle was former mayor Louis P. Fuhrmann. The Roesch's lived at one address for their entire marriage, 633 North Oak Street, just down the block from where he was born.

He was elected Mayor on November 5, 1929, as the Republican candidate. During his term the country was in the throes of the Great Depression and Roesch was a leader and innovator in the relief programs for the unemployed. Buffalo's iconic city hall opened for business. After serving one term, he returned to his wholesale and retail meat business. He died on January 15, 1936, and was buried in Forest Lawn Cemetery.

Roesch Memorial Stadium opened in his honor in 1937.

His grandson, Charles W. Roesch, continues to run the family business under the name Charlie the Butcher.

Political offices
Preceded by Frank X. Schwab	Mayor of Buffalo, NY; 1930–1934	Succeeded by George J. Zimmermann
