= Prospect Avenue Baptist Church =

Historic building in Buffalo, New York

Coordinates: 42.8912°N 78.88058°W

Prospect Avenue Baptist Church, originally Ninth Street Baptist Church, is a historic building in Buffalo, New York. Located at 262 Georgia St., the church was originally built in 1868 and underwent an expansion and build-out in 1882 according to the architectural designs of Buffalo architect F.W. Caulkins. The church is located in Buffalo's West Village Historic District. As of 2012 a renovation was planned. The church includes mahogany pews. It is located at the northeast corner of Georgia Street and Prospect Avenue at the address of 262 Georgia Street.

The church was a prominent dynamic center of traditional worship and mission during the mid-twentieth century. Prominent Buffalo business people attended the church (The Peachey's of Loblaws Markets, M.J Peterson of real estate development), but it was mainly made up of those of the working class. Its high point of influence occurred in the 1930s to the early 1960s, under the leadership of pastors such as George Alden Cole. Like many inner-city churches, Prospect experienced ongoing decline in the late 20th century. Many of its members had moved to the suburbs and the neighborhood demographic changed significantly. Theologically, the church evolved towards a conservative Baptist mindset over its history, although as a child, the great liberal theologian of the 20th century, Harry Emerson Fosdick (Riverside Church), attended the church, as his father was the song leader. By the 1960s, the church had a large light-up sign atop the building and adopted the slogan, "The Downtown Church Holding Forth the Word of Life."

During the late 1980s until its closure, the church struggled to maintain a core group, and enlisted a long-term retired interim pastor from the suburbs, as well as guest preachers. A Hispanic congregation that had rented the building for Sunday afternoon worship services eventually took ownership of it, but later moved to a smaller location.

In 2012, the church building was sold to the Evergreen Association (see link for story below) and renamed to Evergreen Commons.
