= List of mayors of Buffalo, New York =

Mayor of the City of Buffalo
- City seal

- City flag

- Incumbent; Sean Ryan since January 1, 2026
- Government of Buffalo
- Style: The Honorable
- Seat: Buffalo City Hall
- Term length: Four years; renewable
- Constituting instrument: Buffalo City Charter
- Inaugural holder: Ebenezer Johnson
- Formation: 1832
- Succession: Deputy Mayor of Buffalo
- Deputy: Deputy Mayor of Buffalo
- Salary: $178,519 (2024)
- Website: www.buffalony.gov/490/Mayor

The mayor of Buffalo is the head of government and chief executive for the city of Buffalo, New York, the second-largest city in New York State. The city was officially chartered in 1832, with Ebenezer Johnson, a local doctor, appointed its first mayor by the newly established Buffalo Common Council.

== List of mayors ==
Mayors of the City of Buffalo
No.	Mayor	Term in office	Party
1	Ebenezer Johnson (1786–1849)	May 28, 1832 – March 12, 1833 (re-elected, declined) (Note: Johnson was unanimously re-elected by the Board of Aldermen on March 12, 1833, but turned down the position.)	Democratic-Republican
2	Major Andre Andrews (Note: Major was not his rank, but his given name. His granddaughter recounted that he "did not like his name and always signed it M. A. Andrews".) (1792–1834)	March 12, 1833 – 1834 (Note: No later than August 18, when he died of cholera.) (re-elected, declined)	Independent
3	Ebenezer Johnson (1786–1849)	August 19, 1834 – 1835	Democratic-Republican
4	Hiram Pratt (1800–1840)	March 1835 – March 8, 1836	Whig
5	Samuel Wilkeson (1781–1848)	March 8, 1836 – March 14, 1837	Independent
6	Josiah Trowbridge (1785–1862)	March 14, 1837 – December 22, 1837 (Note: Trowbridge reportedly resigned on December 21, but it was not submitted to the Common Council until the following day.) (resigned)	Whig (Note: Earlier in his life, Trowbridge was member of the Federalist Party.)
7	Pierre A. Barker (1790–1870)	January 5, 1838 (Note: Barker was appointed acting mayor immediately following Trowbridge's resignation, but was not confirmed full mayor until January.) – March 14, 1838	Independent
8	Ebenezer Walden	March 13, 1838 – 1839	Whig
9	Hiram Pratt (1800–1840)	March 12, 1839 – 1840	Whig
10	Sheldon Thompson	1840 – March 2, 1841	Whig
11	Isaac R. Harrington	March 2, 1840 – March 8, 1841	Whig
12	George W. Clinton (1807–1885)	March 1, 1842 – 1843	Democratic
13	Joseph G. Masten (1809–1871)	March 14, 1843 – 1844 (did not seek re-election)	Democratic
14	William Ketchum (1798–1876)	1844 – 1845 (did not seek re-election)	Whig
15	Joseph G. Masten (1809–1871)	1845 – 1846 (did not seek re-election)	Democratic
16	Solomon G. Haven (1810–1861)	1846 – 1847	Whig
17	Elbridge G. Spaulding (1809–1897)	1847 – 1848	Whig (Note: Spaulding later changed his affiliation to the Republican Party.)
18	Orlando Allen (1803–1874)	February 28, 1848 – 1849	Whig
19	Hiram Barton (1810–1880)	1849 – 1850 (did not seek re-election)	Whig
20	Henry K. Smith	1850 – March 4, 1851	Democratic
21	James Wadsworth	March 4, 1851 – 1850	Democratic
22	Hiram Barton (1810–1880)	March 9, 1852 – 1853	Whig
23	Eli Cook (1814–1865)	January 1, 1854 – 1855 (did not seek re-election)	Democratic
24	Frederick P. Stevens (1810–1866)	1856 – 1857 (lost re-election) (Note: While in office, Stevens's relationship with the Democratic Party soured and he changed his affiliation to the Republican Party. The following year, he was the Republican candidate, but lost in the general election.)	Democratic
25	Timothy T. Lockwood	1858 – January 2, 1860	Democratic
26	Franklin A. Alberger (1825–1877)	January 2, 1858 – January 6, 1862	Republican (Note: Formerly a Whig)
27	William G. Fargo (1818–1881)	January 6, 1862 – 1866 (lost election)	Democratic
28	Chandler J. Wells (1814–1887)	October 17, 1866 – 1867	National Union
29	William Findlay Rogers (1820–1899)	1868 – 1869	Democratic
30	Alexander Brush	1870 – 1873 (declined nomination)	Republican
31	Lewis P. Dayton (1824–1900)	1874 – 1875 (did not seek re-election)	Democratic
32	Philip Becker	1876 – January 7, 1878	Republican
33	Solomon Scheu	January 7, 1878 – January 1880	Democratic
34	Alexander Brush	January 1, 1880 – January 2, 1882	Republican
35	Grover Cleveland (1837–1908)	January 2, 1882 – November 20, 1882 (resigned)	Democratic
36	Marcus M. Drake (1835–1907)	November 20, 1882 – December 29, 1882 (Note: Bullard (1981c) erroneously states that the date of resignation was December 22, but other sources, including Buffalo Courier Express (1882), Buffalo Courier (1882), and even Bullard himself in Bullard (1981a), uniformly cite December 29.) (resigned)	Republican
37	Harmon S. Cutting (1830–1884)	December 29, 1882 – January 9, 1883 (did not seek election)	Democratic
38	John B. Manning	January 16, 1883 – January 6, 1884	Democratic
39	Jonathan Scoville (1830–1891)	January 6, 1884 – 1885	Democratic
40	Philip Becker	1886 – 1890	Republican
41	Charles F. Bishop	1890 – 1894	Democratic
42	Edgar B. Jewett (1843–1924)	January 7, 1895 – January 1, 1898 (did not seek re-election)	Republican
43	Conrad Diehl	January 1, 1898 – 1901	Democratic
44	Erastus C. Knight (1857–1923)	1902 – 1905 (did not seek re-election)	Republican
45	James N. Adam (1842–1912)	January 1, 1906 – December 31, 1909	Democratic
46	Louis P. Fuhrmann	January 1, 1910 – 1917	Democratic
47	George S. Buck	1918 – 1921 (lost election)	Republican
48	Frank X. Schwab (1874–1946)	January 2, 1922 – December 31, 1929 (lost election) (Note: In 1929, Schwab lost the Republican primary to Charles E. Roesch. After his loss, he switched his affiliation to the Democratic Party, where he swept the primary. Roesch defeated him in the general election.)	Republican
49	Charles E. Roesch (1886–1936)	1930 – 1933 (retired)	Republican
50	George J. Zimmermann (1882–1938)	January 1, 1934 (Note: Zimmermann's signed oath of office erroneously states the date as January 1, 1933, which was lampooned in the Buffalo Evening News.) – December 31, 1937	Democratic
51	Thomas L. Holling (1899–1966)	January 1, 1938 – 1941 (declined to run) (Note: Holling ran for mayor again in the 1945 election, but lost in a three-way race between Bernard J. Dowd, the Republican victor, and former mayor Frank X. Schwab, who ran on the People's Party ticket.)	Democratic (Note: Holling was an independent who ran in the Democratic primary. He is typically referred to as an Independent Democrat.)
52	Joseph J. Kelly (1897–1963)	January 1, 1942 (Note: Kelly was administered the oath of office the day before, but officially became mayor on January 1, 1942.) – December 31, 1945	Democratic
53	Bernard J. Dowd (1891–1971)	January 1, 1946 – January 1, 1950 (term-limited) (Note: At the time, mayors could only serve for one four-year term.)	Republican
54	Joseph Mruk (1903–1995)	January 1, 1950 – December 31, 1953 (term-limited) (Note: At the time, mayors could only serve for one four-year term.)	Republican
55	Steven Pankow	January 1, 1954 – December 31, 1957	Democratic (Note: Pankow switched his registration from Republican to Democratic sometime shortly before 1948.)
56	Frank A. Sedita (1907–1975)	January 1, 1958 – December 31, 1961 (lost primary)	Democratic
57	Chester Kowal (Note: Kowal's original surname was Kowalczewski, which his father shortened in order to avoid anti-Polish discrimination while seeking employment. At least three different initials have been given for his middle name: A, W, and C.) (1907–1966)	January 1, 1962 – December 31, 1965	Republican
58	Frank A. Sedita (1907–1975)	January 1, 1966 – March 5, 1973 (resigned)	Democratic
59	Stanley Makowski (1923–1981)	March 5, 1973 – December 31, 1977 (declined to run)	Democratic
60	James D. Griffin (1929–2008)	January 1, 1978 – December 31, 1993 (retired)	Democratic (Note: Despite running on other parties' tickets, Griffin was a registered Democrat for his entire life. In 1977, he lost the Democratic primary, but ran on the Conservative Party ticket which went on to win. During the 1981 mayoral election, Griffin ran on the Democratic, Republican, and Conservative lines, as is allowed in New York. For his final two terms in office, he served as a Republican.)
61	Anthony Masiello (born c. 1947)	January 1, 1994 – December 31, 2005 (declined to run)	Democratic
62	Byron Brown (born 1958)	December 31, 2005 – October 15, 2024 (resigned)	Democratic
63	Christopher Scanlon (Note: Scanlon became acting mayor following the resignation of Byron Brown on October 15, 2024. However, he is listed as mayor on the City of Buffalo's History of Mayors list.) (born 1981)	October 15, 2024 – December 31, 2025 (lost primary)	Democratic
64	Sean Ryan (born 1960)	January 1, 2026 – Incumbent	Democratic

== History ==
In 1853, the charter of the city was amended to include the town of Black Rock and the city proper was divided into thirteen wards. In addition, the term of city offices, including mayor changed from a one-year term to a two-year term and was elected directly by the people.

== Mayoral elections ==
(winners are in bold)

Date	Candidates				
November 8, 1881	**Grover Cleveland**	Milton Beebe			
	15,120	11,528			
January 9, 1883	**John B. Manning**	Robert R. Hefford			
	11,036	7,321			
November 6, 1973	**Stanley M. Makowski**	Stewart M. Levy	John A. Westra	Patrick W. Giagnacova	Ira Liebowitz
	77,569	24,423	2,640	1,147	597
November 2, 1993	**Anthony Masiello**	Richard A. Grimm	Eugene Fahey		
	36,092	9,277	7,566		
November 8, 2005	**Byron Brown**	Kevin Helfer	Judith Einach	Charles Flynn	
	46,613	19,853	3,525	3,082	
November 3, 2009	**Byron Brown**	Michael P. Kearns			
	17,728	158			
November 5, 2013	**Byron Brown**	Sergio Rodriguez			
	26,120	10,733			
November 7, 2017	**Byron Brown**	Mark J F Schroeder	Anita Howard	Terrence Robinson	Taniqua Simmons
	29,688	11,446	1,357	1,276	102
November 2, 2021	**Byron Brown**	India Walton	Ben Carlisle	Jaz Miles	William O'Dell
	38,338	25,773	219	23	8

== See also ==
- Timeline of Buffalo, New York
