= Thomas L. Holling =

American politician (1889–1966)

- Holling, c. 1939

51st Mayor of Buffalo
- In office 1938–1941
- Preceded by: George J. Zimmermann
- Succeeded by: Joseph J. Kelly

Personal details
- Born: April 23, 1889 Bad Axe, Michigan, U.S.
- Died: November 25, 1966 (aged 77) Redington Beach, Florida, U.S.
- Party: Democratic
- Spouse(s): Mary Lenhard; Helen Busch Steele
- Children: 1

Thomas Leslie Holling (April 23, 1889 – November 25, 1966) was mayor of the City of Buffalo, New York, serving 1938–1941. He was born April 23, 1889, in Bad Axe, Michigan. He grew up in Wyoming, Ontario, moving to Buffalo in 1906, and learned the printing business. He started his own printing business in 1911, the Holling Press, with $35 in capital. In 1924, the company opened a new 10-story plant at 501 Washington Street. On June 14, 1910, he married Mary Lenhard; she died in 1955 and he remarried the following year to Helen Busch Steele in St. Petersburg, Florida.

He was elected mayor on November 2, 1937, as the Democratic candidate, and held office from 1938 to 1941. During his term, the Lakeview and Willert Park housing projects were developed. Also constructed was the Kleinhans Music Hall and Buffalo Memorial Auditorium. After completing his single term, he returned to private life. In 1943, he sold his printing company to businessman Leo Ward. In 1945, he received the Democratic nomination for mayor, but was defeated in the election by the Republican candidate Bernard J. Dowd. In July 1946, Holling was one of several possible candidates in consideration for the post of governor of Puerto Rico.

He died on November 25, 1966, in his home in Redington Beach, Florida, and was buried in Mount Calvary Cemetery in Cheektowaga, New York.

Political offices
Preceded by George J. Zimmermann	Mayor of Buffalo, NY; 1938–1941	Succeeded by Joseph J. Kelly
