= Flag of Buffalo, New York =

- Use: Civil flag
- Proportion: 5:8
- Adopted: May 7, 1924
- Design: The city seal with 13 lightning bolts and stars on a blue background.
- Designed by: Louis Greenstein

The flag of Buffalo, New York, is a navy blue flag that contains a large central emblem consisting of the city seal with 13 "electric flashes" (depicted as lightning bolts) and interspaced 5-pointed white stars emanating from it.

== History ==
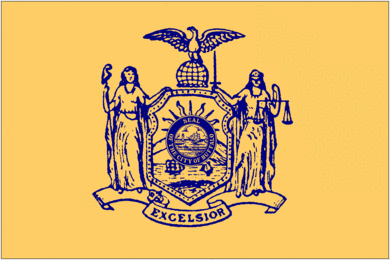
Former flag, 1912–1924

Following a request from New York City publisher, the Julius Bien Company, to provide a copy of the banner graphic for a work depicting the flags of large municipalities, Mayor Louis P. Fuhrmann and Commissioner of Public Works, Francis G. Ward, proposed a design. The city's first flag was composed of the city seal superimposed on the state coat-of-arms in blue over a buff-colored background.

=== 1912 proposal ===
From Common Council Proceedings, June 3, 1912:

To the left center a lighthouse on pier with ship passing it into harbor. To the lower right canal boat passing into canal to the right surrounded in circle by the legend "City of Buffalo, Incorporated 1832."

The municipalities of the United States having as a rule a Municipal Flag, examinination shows the general practice to be the use of the Coat of Arms of the City or the Coat of Arms of the State upon which is superimposed the seal of the City.

In accordance with the latter rule we submit as a design for the Municipal Flag of the City of Buffalo, the following:

"The Coat of Arms of the State of New York with the Seal of the City of Buffalo superimposed upon the shield of the same all in blue upon the field of the flag in Continental buff."

(Despite the assertion above, no such "general practice" of superimposing city seals over state seals has been documented.)

=== Flag seal ===
Though the Common Council passed an ordinance describing the official seal of the city and its flag, the seal described was not the one included on the banner. At the time there were several seals being used by various city officials. The seal depicted on the flag was actually the seal being used by the Mayor. There are a few differences, the most glaring being the legend surrounding the circle says "Seal of the City of Buffalo" instead of "City of Buffalo, Incorporated 1832." The Mayoral seal also depicts two mules, nonexistent in the Common Council version, pulling the canal boat in the opposite direction described by the council. The large ship and the pier are also completely different.

=== Current flag ===
In 1922, mayor Frank X. Schwab remarked to the Common Council that the flag did not sufficiently represent the city and proposed a contest for a new flag. After the contest failed to produce a winning design, a new contest was proposed with a more substantial reward. Seventy-three designs were submitted and the City Planning Committee with input from the Fine Arts Academy selected the new flag based on its simplicity and distinctiveness. The $250 reward was given to local architect Louis Greenstein. The flag was adopted on May 7, 1924, and dedicated to the city on the following Flag Day, June 14, 1924.

Louis Greenstein's home still stands today at 64 Tudor Place and Cleveland across from Nardin Academy.

== Symbolism ==
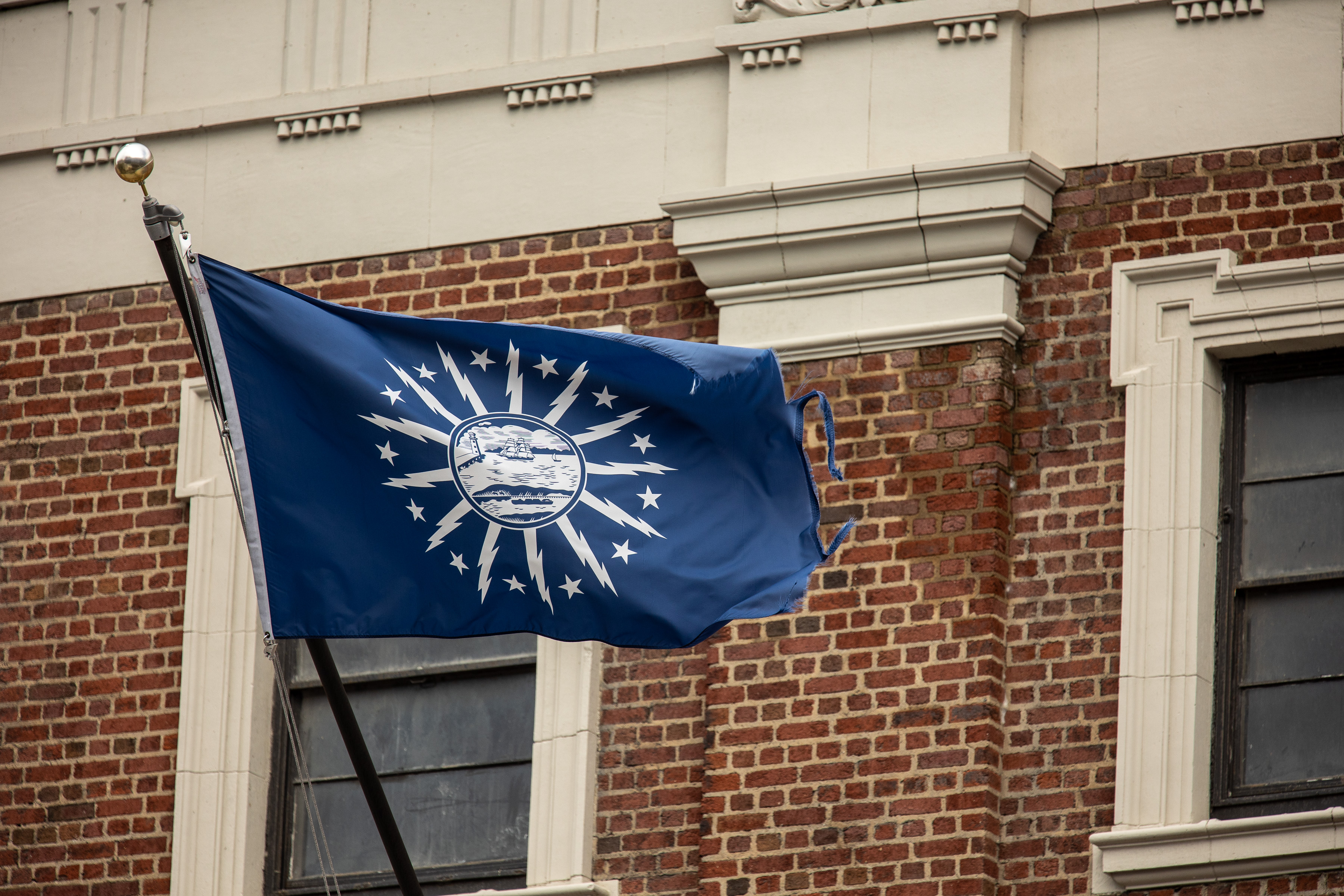
In front of Buffalo's Statler Hotel

The city flag is meant to illustrate the energy and zeal behind the spirit of Buffalo. According to then Mayor Frank X. Schwab, it signifies the love and admiration which Buffalonians have for their city.

The thirteen stars signify New York's status as one of the original Thirteen Colonies. The matching number of electric flashes celebrate Buffalo as one of the first cities to deploy electric service widely. The seal in the center contains a lighthouse and a boat, representing Buffalo's important spot as a trade center on Lake Erie and the Erie Canal.
