= Nick J Schwab Jr =

American artist (1912–1982)

Nick J. Schwab Jr.
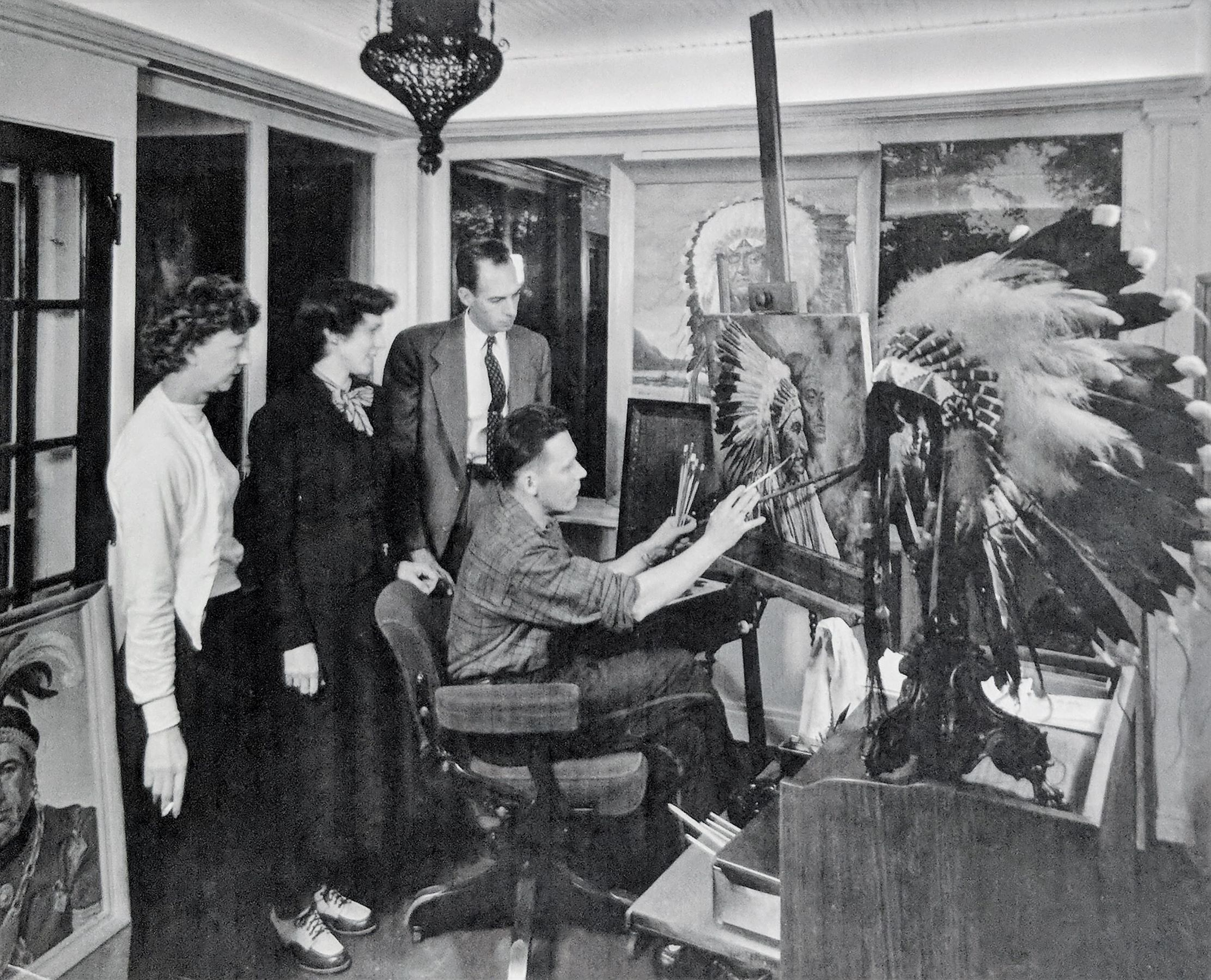
- Schwab working on his painting, Red Tomahawk and Sitting Bull.
- Born: Francis X. Schwab; April 24, 1912; Buffalo, New York, U.S.
- Died: December 17, 1982 (aged 70); Cincinnati, Ohio, U.S.
- Occupations: Artist, marketer
- Known for: Painting, illustration

Nick J. Schwab Jr. (April 24, 1912 – December 17, 1982) was an American painter, illustrator, and marketer.

He designed the Iroquois Brewery logo and associated marketing materials, and his work was seen on millions of beer bottles.

== Life ==
=== Early years ===
Nick J. Schwab Jr. was born on April 24, 1912, in Buffalo, New York, to Nicholas J. Schwab and Clara M. Schwab (nee Hofmeyer). He was baptized Francis X. Schwab, being named after Francis X. Schwab, one of his six uncles.

His interest in painting began at an early age, after submitting a drawing of a Native American as an entry to a Buffalo Courier-Express–sponsored contest. Schwab won the contest, and its associated prize of $1, and his lifelong love of painting and drawing, with an emphasis on Native Americans, took hold.

=== Marketing years ===
Schwab was the vice president of advertising and sales promotion for Iroquois Breweries. In 1938, he re-created the Iroquois Brewery Indian head trademark/logo, changing it from a European-style Indian head, to a more accurate depiction of a Native American, Iroquois Indian chief.

=== World War II ===
In 1943, during World War II, Schwab painted one of his most recognizable works, Jungle Soldier. His painting was recognized by the Treasury War Finance Division, and considered for use as a poster in the Fifth War Loan Drive. The painting was used by the American Red Cross, and won Schwab national acclaim. A contemporary of illustrator and painter Norman Rockwell, Schwab spent time with Rockwell, and received helpful criticism and encouragement from him.

=== Later career ===
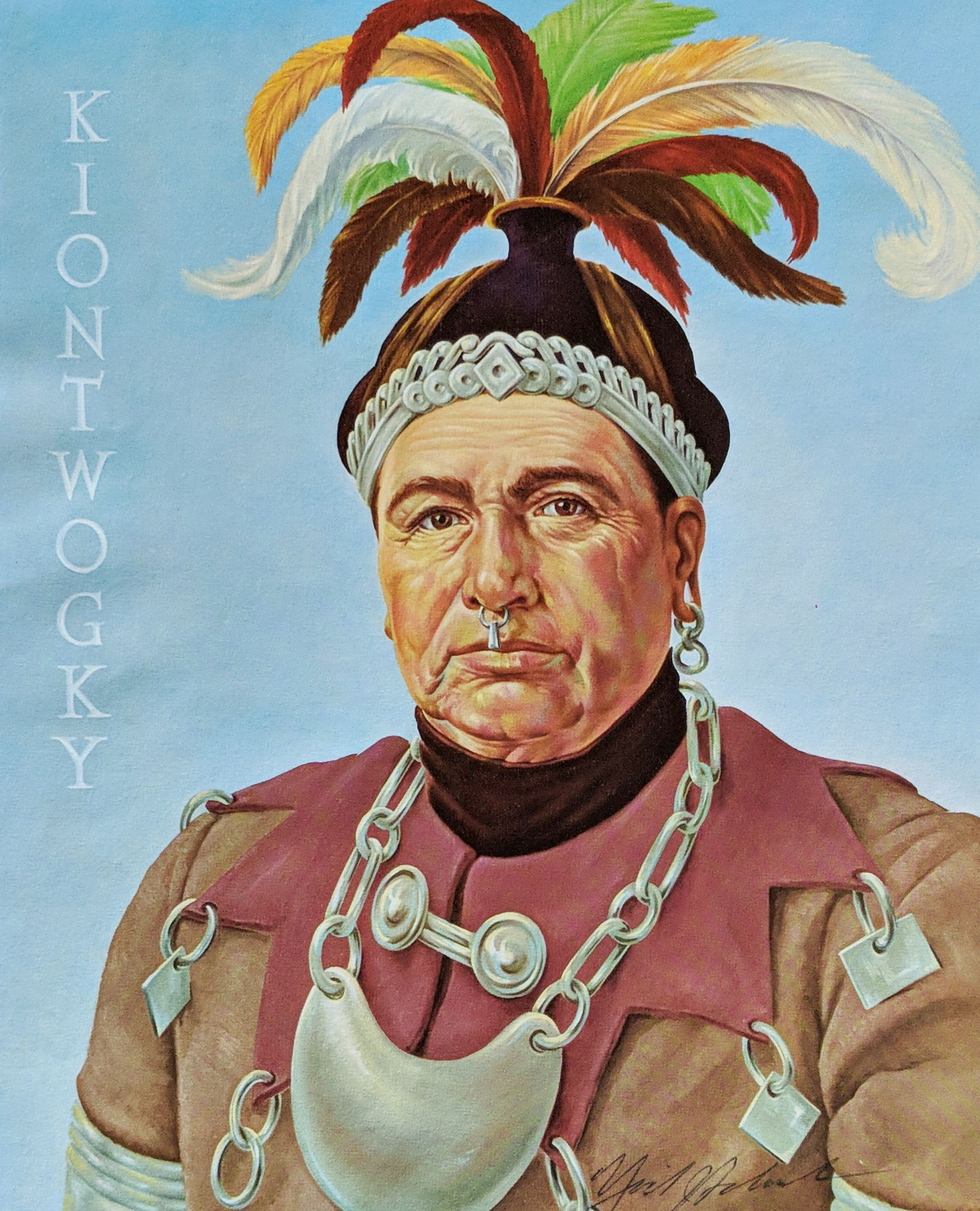
Depiction of Kiontwogky by Nick J. Schwab Jr.

After nearly twenty years of leading the marketing and advertising initiatives of Iroquois Breweries, Schwab moved to Cincinnati, Ohio, in 1965. He became director of research and development for the American Sign and Display Company.

His passion for painting and drawing never waned, as he continued to paint until his death.

==== Death ====
Schwab died on December 17, 1982, at the age 70 in Cincinnati, Ohio. He was survived by his widow, his son and three daughters, and his three sisters.

== Major works ==
- Jungle Soldier (1944)
- Red Tomahawk & Sitting Bull (1948)
- Calf Child
- Sitting Bull
- Wolf Collar
- Comanche's Pinto
- Kiontwogky (Chief Corn Planter)
- Reprieve (1964)
