= Caulkins =

Caulkins is a surname. Notable people with the surname include:

- F.W. Caulkins (1855–1940), American architect
- Frances Manwaring Caulkins (1795–1869), American historian, genealogist, author
- Horace Caulkins (1850–1932), American ceramic artist
- Jonathan Caulkins (born 1965), American drug policy researcher
- Tracy Caulkins (born 1963), American swimmer

== See also ==
- Ellie Caulkins Opera House, Denver, Colorado, U.S.A
