= George J. Zimmermann =

American politician (1882–1938)

50th Mayor of Buffalo
- In office 1934–1937
- Preceded by: Charles E. Roesch
- Succeeded by: Thomas L. Holling

Personal details
- Born: June 19, 1882 Buffalo, New York
- Died: September 14, 1938 (aged 56) Buffalo, New York
- Party: Democratic
- Spouse: Gertrude Cochrane
- Children: 3

George J. Zimmermann (June 19, 1882 – September 14, 1938) was Mayor of the City of Buffalo, New York, serving from 1934 until 1937. He was born in Buffalo on June 19, 1882. He joined his father's lumber business, eventually becoming a partner. He married Gertrude Cochrane in 1923.

During the mayoral campaign, Zimmermann traveled to New York City and Washington, D.C., and secured almost $6,000,000 ($149 million in 2025) worth of construction to be financed with federal funds for the Fillmore-Lovejoy sewer project and Kensington High School. He was elected mayor on November 8, 1933, as the Democratic candidate. On April 18, 1936, formal charges were filed against Zimmermann to Governor Herbert H. Lehman charging 20 alleged counts of official misconduct. Included were Zimmermann's part in the sewage disposal project and the reported "deal" with former Mayor Schwab. A grand jury indicted him. On May 1, 1936, he was arraigned, and returned to work the following day.

After his term he returned to private life. He was once again indicted on March 14, 1938, by a grand jury related to his alleged activity regarding Buffalo's $15,000,000 ($343 million in 2025) sewer project. A New York Supreme Court jury returned guilty verdicts on six of the nine counts charged against him. While awaiting the decision from his appeal, he died on September 14, 1938, and was buried in Mt. Calvary Cemetery in Cheektowaga, New York.

Political offices
Preceded by Charles E. Roesch	Mayor of Buffalo, NY; 1934–1937	Succeeded by Thomas L. Holling
