= Timothy T. Lockwood =

American politician

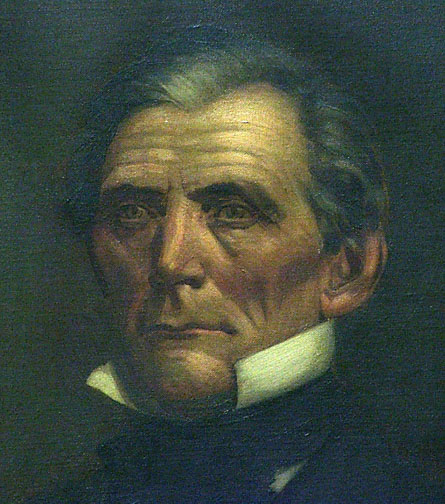
- Portrait of Timothy T. Lockwood

25th Mayor of Buffalo
- In office 1858–1859
- Preceded by: Frederick P. Stevens
- Succeeded by: Franklin A. Alberger

Personal details
- Born: 1810 North East, New York
- Died: December 23, 1870 (aged 59–60) Utica, New York
- Party: Democratic
- Spouse(s): married twice; Charlotte and Louise C. Francher
- Children: four children

Timothy T. Lockwood (1810–1870) was Mayor of the City of Buffalo, New York, serving 1858–1859. He was born in North East, New York in 1810. In the early 1830s, he studied medicine at Philadelphia Medical College in Philadelphia, Pennsylvania. He returned to Buffalo around 1842 and became a member of the Erie County Medical Society. In 1851, Lockwood was appointed city health physician under Mayor James Wadsworth. He was married to Charlotte of Hamburg, New York; she died and he re-married on October 25, 1869, this time to Louise C. Francher.

He was elected as mayor of Buffalo on June 9, 1857 as the Democratic candidate. His term as mayor ended on January 3, 1859. After his term expired, Lockwood resumed his medical practice. On December 23, 1870, he died in Utica, New York, and was buried between the bodies of both his wives in Forest Lawn Cemetery.

Political offices
Preceded by Frederick P. Stevens	Mayor of Buffalo, NY; 1858–1859	Succeeded by Franklin A. Alberger
