= Frederick P. Stevens =

American politician (1810–1866)

24th Mayor of Buffalo
- In office 1856–1857
- Preceded by: Eli Cook
- Succeeded by: Timothy T. Lockwood

Personal details
- Born: October 26, 1810 Pierpont, New Hampshire
- Died: March 23, 1866 (aged 55) Buffalo, New York
- Party: Democratic

Frederick P. Stevens (1810–1866) was Mayor of the City of Buffalo, New York, serving 1856–1857. He was born on October 26, 1810, in Pierpont, New Hampshire. He taught, studied law, and was admitted to the bar in 1835 or 1836, soon after coming to Buffalo. On January 20, 1837, he was appointed judge of the Court of Common Pleas by Governor William L. Marcy. He was the first presiding judge of Erie County Court, successor to the Court of Common Pleas. He never married.

In 1854, Stevens was elected an alderman for the eleventh ward. He was elected mayor of Buffalo on November 6, 1855, as the Democratic candidate. During his term, the city undertook an extensive program of street, sidewalk, and street light improvements. He is credited as the originator of Buffalo's street railway system and was one of the first people to actively campaign for an international bridge between Buffalo and Canada.

He was a Republican Union member of the New York State Assembly (Erie Co., 2nd D.) in 1864. He died at Buffalo on March 23, 1866.

Political offices
Preceded by Eli Cook	Mayor of Buffalo, New York; 1856–1857	Succeeded by Timothy T. Lockwood
New York State Assembly
Preceded by Horatio Seymour	New York State Assembly; Erie County, 2nd District; 1864	Succeeded by Harmon S. Cutting
