= Joseph Mruk =

American politician

- Mruk in 1949

54th Mayor of Buffalo
- In office January 1, 1950 – December 31, 1953
- Preceded by: Bernard J. Dowd
- Succeeded by: Steven Pankow

Member of the U.S. House of Representatives from New York's 41st district
- In office January 3, 1943 – January 3, 1945
- Preceded by: Alfred F. Beiter
- Succeeded by: James W. Wadsworth Jr.

Personal details
- Born: November 6, 1903 Buffalo, New York, U.S.
- Died: January 21, 1995 (aged 91) Buffalo, New York, U.S.
- Party: Republican
- Profession: Jeweler

Joseph Mruk (November 6, 1903 – January 21, 1995) was an American businessman and Republican politician from Buffalo, New York. He is most notable for his service as a member of the United States House of Representatives from 1943 to 1945, and as mayor of Buffalo from 1950 to 1953.

== Early life ==
Mruk was of Polish heritage, and was born in Buffalo, New York, on November 6, 1903. He attended Public School 44 and Saint John Kanty School, and graduated from South Park High School in 1920. Mruk then began a career in the jewelry business by working at several stores in the Buffalo area. In 1926, he opened his own store, which he continued to operate until the 1970s.

== Start of political career ==
A Republican, Mruk ran unsuccessfully for member of the Erie County Board of Supervisors in 1933, and a seat on the Buffalo Common Council in 1935. He won a Common Council seat on his second attempt, and served as a district representative from 1937 to 1941. He was elected as an at-large member in 1941, and served until resigning in 1942.

== Congressman ==
In 1942, Mruk was elected to the U.S. House as a Republican, and served one term (1943-1945) as the representative of New York's 41st District. In Congress, Mruk questioned the Soviet Union's intentions for post-World War II Poland; as the Soviets were still part of the Allied effort against Nazi Germany, Mruk's concerns prompted assurances from President Franklin D. Roosevelt that Poland would not lose its sovereignty. Mruk also opposed creation of the Saint Lawrence Seaway, which Buffalo residents believed would hurt their city. As a result, he became unpopular with the Republican leadership, who endorsed his 1944 primary opponent, Edward J. Elsaesser

== Continued career ==
After leaving Congress, Mruk returned to active management of his jewelry store. In 1945, he was an unsuccessful candidate for mayor. In 1947, he again won election to the Buffalo Common Council, and he served until 1950, when he became mayor.

== Buffalo mayor ==
Mruk won the 1949 mayoral election against the Democratic nominee, Chief City Judge Joseph Hillery and two other candidates. His campaign was buoyed by Polish-Americans who usually voted for Democrats, but were unhappy that the Soviet Union had in fact made Poland part of the Eastern Bloc following World War II. Mruk served from January 1, 1950, to December 31, 1953, and his time in office was highlighted by his concentration on rebuilding the city's infrastructure, including streets, bridges and viaducts. He also worked to improve parks and recreation areas, instituted a lighted school house program to foster community involvement in the city's education system, and hired the city's first school crossing guards. Relying on his business experience to master the details of Buffalo's budgets and spending, Mruk took pride in effecting most of his programs without having to increase local taxes.

== Later life ==
In 1954, Mruk was an unsuccessful candidate for the U.S. House. In the 1950s and 1960s, Mruk served as a member of the state Commission on Pensions. In 1961, he was an unsuccessful candidate for the Republican nomination for mayor. He closed his jewelry store in the mid 1970s, and in 1980 he moved to Florida, where he lived in retirement with his sister Clara and her husband.

== Death and burial ==
Mruk returned to Buffalo in 1988, and spent the last years of his life residing in a Lancaster nursing home. He died in Lancaster on January 21, 1995, and was buried at Saint Stanislaus Roman Catholic Cemetery in Cheektowaga.

== Family ==
Mruk was a lifelong bachelor. During his time as mayor, his sister acted as first lady during public ceremonies and other events.

== Sources ==
=== Books ===
- Rizzo, Michael (2005). Through The Mayors' Eyes. Lulu. ISBN 978-1-4116-3757-3.

=== Newspapers ===
- Tarapacki, Thomas (July 13, 2017). "Tom Talk: Mruk was Buffalo's first Polish American mayor". Am-Pol Eagle. Cheektowaga, NY.

U.S. House of Representatives
Preceded by Alfred F. Beiter	Member of the U.S. House of Representatives from New York's 41st congressional district 1943–1945	Succeeded by James W. Wadsworth, Jr.
Political offices
Preceded by Bernard J. Dowd	Mayor of Buffalo, New York; 1950–1953	Succeeded by Steven Pankow
