= F.W. Caulkins =

American architect (1855–1940)

Franklin Wellington Caulkins
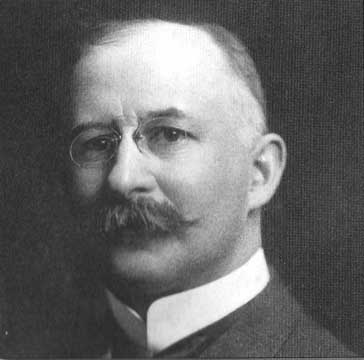
- Born: April 28, 1855; Hartford, Connecticut, U.S.
- Died: January 9, 1940 (aged 84); Bedford, Virginia, U.S.
- Occupation: Architect

Franklin Wellington Caulkins was a prominent architect in Buffalo, New York.

Caulkins was born in Hartford, Connecticut, to Dr. Russell Caulkins and Jane Whitbeck and later moved with his family to Toledo, Ohio, where he studied architecture from 1865 to 1870. From that time until he went to work at the Buffalo office of Milton Beebe in 1875 he worked at the architectural offices of Charles Coots in Rochester, New York, and then at the offices of A.C. Bruce in Knoxville, Tennessee, before returning to Rochester to work briefly for Coots. He established himself as an architect and superintendent in room 8 of the Townsend Block, located at the corner of Main and Swan Streets in Buffalo, in April 1879 and relocated to Minneapolis, Minnesota from 1882 to 1885, during which time was a partner (separately) with John L. Telford and O.P. Dennis. Caulkins returned to Buffalo in 1885, and moved his office into the Chapin Building, where he remained until 1903.
In 1878 Caulklins married Jennie Louise Van Slyke (1858–1904) of Rochester, New York, with whom he had a son and a daughter. He moved to Missouri in 1903, became a widower in 1904 and then married Gertrude B. Smith (1880-1938), with whom he had two more sons and another daughter before they were divorced. From 1905 he worked in Missouri, Texas and Louisiana until his retirement in 1930. After retiring he lived at the National Elks Home in Bedford, Virginia. He died in Bedford in 1940.
In 1886 he became a founding member of the Buffalo Society of Architects, which was incorporated as the Buffalo chapter of the American Institute of Architects in 1890. Between 1876 and 1881 Louise Blanchard Bethune, one of few female professional architects at the time, worked in his office and for Richard A. Waite.

== Designs ==
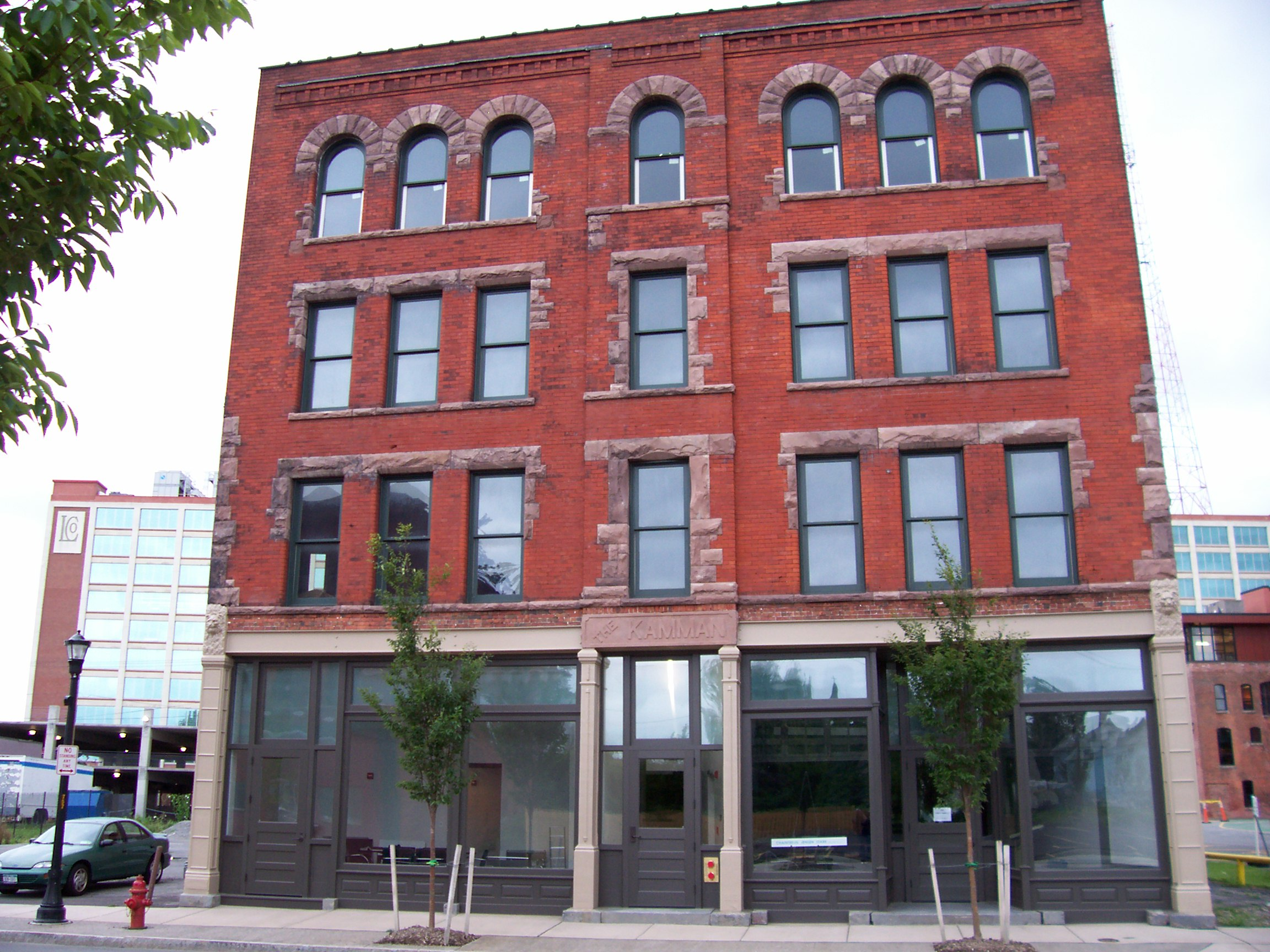
The Kamman Building, 755 Seneca Street, Buffalo, NY, 1878.
Extant

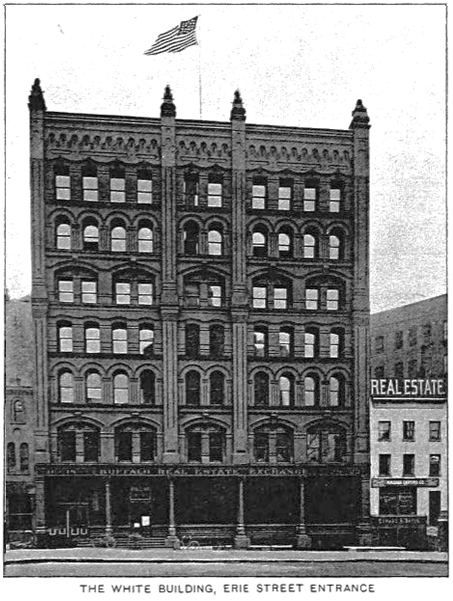
The White Building, 1881. Main and Erie Streets.
Demolished

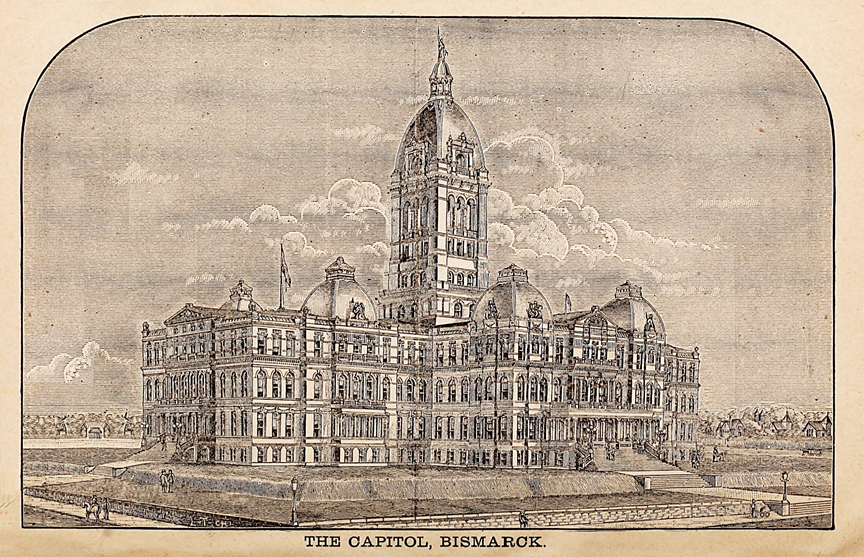
The North Dakota territorial (later state) capitol building as designed by Caulkins with John L. Telford in 1883 during his time in Minneapolis.
Destroyed by fire December 28, 1930

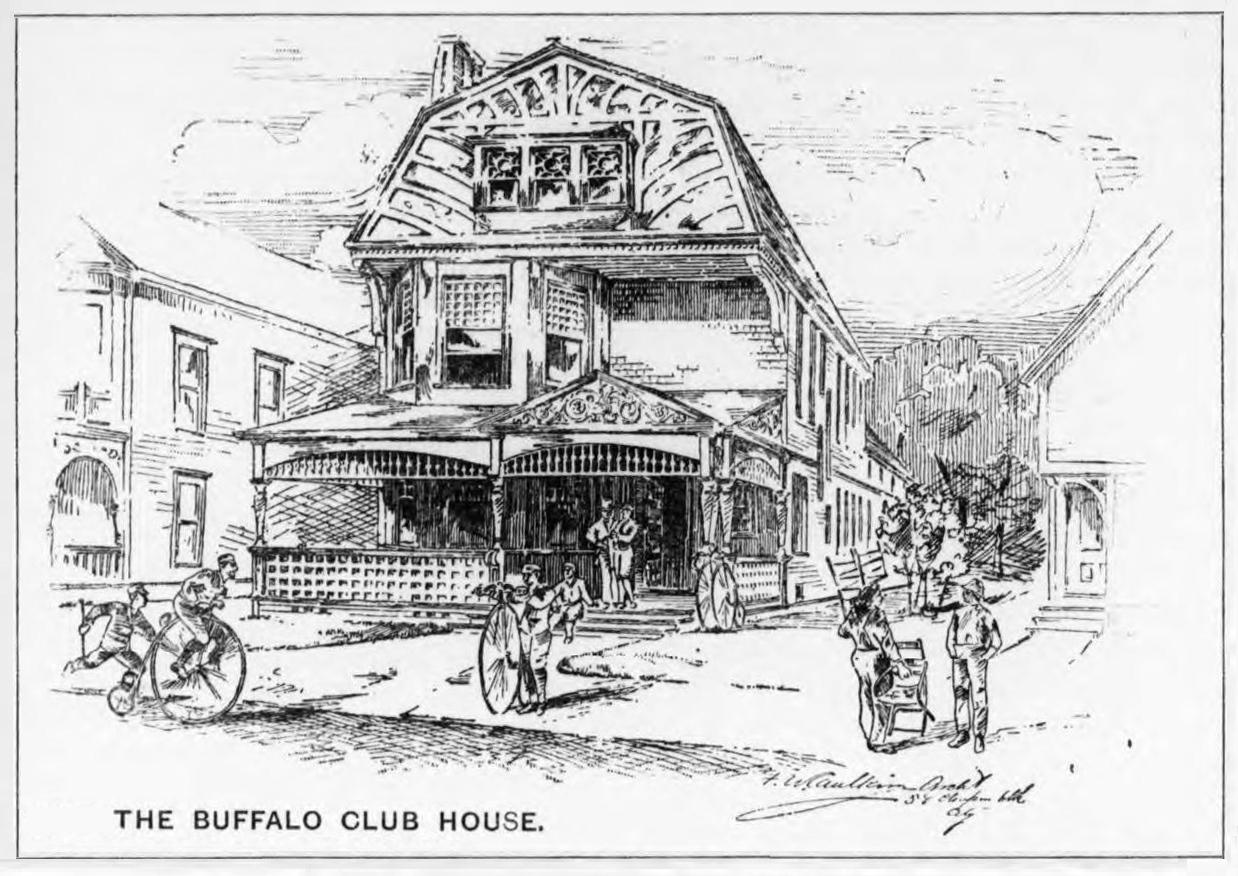
The Buffalo Bicycle Club House, 132 College St., Buffalo, NY, 1887.
Extant

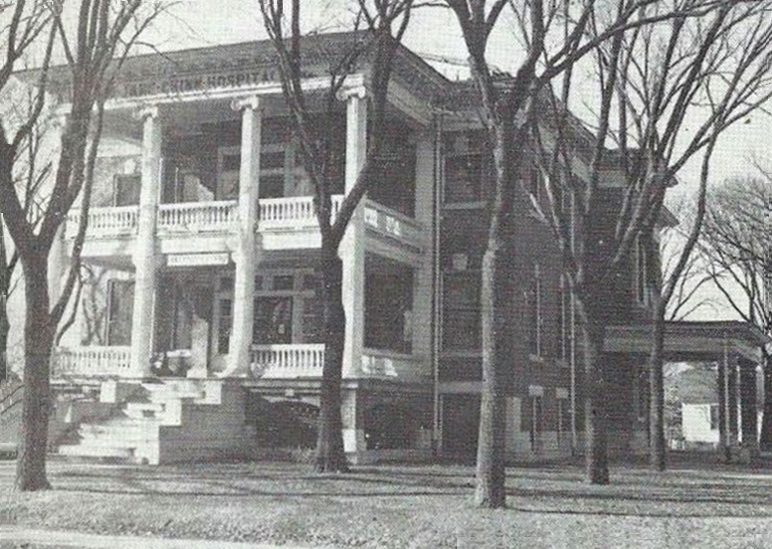
The Jane Chinn Hospital, Webb City, Missouri, 1910.
Extant but altered
- c.1878 - John F. Kamman Building, 755 Seneca Street
- 1878 - Residence for Malcom J. McNiven, 69 Symphony Circle, Buffalo, NY
- 1879 - Residence for Mrs. Ira S. Bennett, 51 Symphony Circle Buffalo, NY
- 1880 - Residence for Frank Porter, 55 Symphony Circle, Buffalo, NY
- 1880 - Residence for James A. Smith, 741 W. Ferry St., Buffalo, NY
- 1880 - Title Guarantee Company building (also known as the Austin Building or Ticor Building), 110 Franklin St., Buffalo, NY. The First Unitarian Church (1833, by Benjamin Rathbun) was torn down except for the Franklin St. facade, raised one story to make three and redesigned by Caulkins, at which time the building was extended in length along Eagle Street and converted to offices. Located in the Joseph Ellicott Historic District, the conversion was carried out after the congregation relocated to a new church and Stephen G. Austin purchased the property in 1880. The Buffalo Fine Arts Academy was housed in the building from 1881 to 1886.
- 1881 - (Dr. James P.) White Building from Main Street to Erie Street (replaced in 1906 with a taller White Building though some of the cast iron columns of the earlier building remain on the Erie Street façade). Circa 1880 he designed the Chapin Building (demolished 1926).
- 1882 - Caulkins Building at 85-87-89 Genesee Street at the corner of Ellicott (collapsed and demolished after long period of disrepair)
- 1882 - F.W. Caulkins house, 415 Franklin Street, Buffalo, NY.
- 1882 - Prospect Avenue Baptist Church (formerly Ninth Street Baptist Church), expansion around the original church at 262 Georgia Street, which was constructed in 1868. Built out of pressed brick with brownstone finish part of Buffalo's West Village Historic District
- 1883 - North Dakota territorial (later state) capitol, Bismarck, North Dakota.
- 1910 - Jane Chinn Hospital (after 2006 Jane Chinn Heights senior apartments), 1400 Austin St., Webb City, Missouri

Other projects included a remodel of the Linwood Avenue house on the southeast corner of Linwood and West Ferry; design of the building at 410 Delaware Ave. (demolished in 1966); 430 Delaware Avenue building for Thomas Ramsdell; building at 85 Genesee Street (demolished); State National Bank at 8 Webster Street in North Tonawanda; and the 1888 Maple Street Baptist Mission Church (demolished early 1980s).; Brick house for W.C. Francis; O.P. Rainsdell (sp?) double brick with brownstone trimming house on Delaware Street; *J.M. Richmond House near Ellicott and Seneca Streets
