= Steven Pankow =

American politician (1908–1993)

- Pankow in 1953

55th Mayor of Buffalo, New York
- In office 1954–1957
- Preceded by: Joseph Mruk
- Succeeded by: Frank A. Sedita

Clerk of Erie County, New York
- In office 1949–1951
- Preceded by: Harry C. Vackel
- Succeeded by: Edward A. Rath

Personal details
- Born: March 29, 1908 Buffalo, New York, U.S.
- Died: July 25, 1993 (aged 85) Buffalo, New York, U.S.
- Resting place: Mount Calvary Cemetery, Cheektowaga, New York
- Party: Democratic
- Spouse: Mary Conwall (m. 1930-1993, his death)
- Occupation: Car dealer Businessman

Steven Pankow (March 29, 1908 – July 25, 1993) was an American businessman and politician. A Democrat, he was most notable for his service as mayor of Buffalo, New York from 1954 to 1957.

== Early life ==
Pankow was born in Buffalo on March 29, 1908, the son of Anastasia (née Kurdupel) and Ivan Pankow. His mother was from Freifeld, a town in Galicia then in the Austrian portion of the Austrian Partition, but now of Kowalówka, Cieszanów, Poland. His parents were of Ukrainian or Ruthenian descent, and the family moved to Freifeld in 1909. Pankow was educated in the parochial schools there before returning to Buffalo with his brother John in 1925, so they could live with an aunt.

Pankow's father later returned to Buffalo, then went back to Freifeld in 1939 intending to bring the rest of the family to Buffalo. World War II commenced with Germany's invasion of Poland soon afterwards, and Pankow's parents, a sister and three brothers were never heard from again. Two sisters who were living in Poland and one who resided in Germany survived the war.

== Start of career ==
After leaving high school early to join the workforce, Pankow worked at local United States Rubber Company and Bethlehem Steel plants until 1930. He then moved into car sales and traveled to Detroit to attended the Chrysler business school for auto salesmen. His success in the car business led Pankow to start Pankow Motors, a Dodge-Plymouth dealership. Pankow was a longtime member and past president of the American Automobile Association of Western New York and the Western New York Automobile Dealers Association. Pankow also belonged to the Moose, the Elks, and the local chamber of commerce.

== Politics ==
=== Erie County Clerk ===
Pankow developed an interest in politics and considered running for a seat in the New York State Senate, but the local Republican organization refused to back him, so Pankow became a Democrat. In 1948, he was the Democratic nominee for Clerk of Erie County, and he achieved an upset win. In 1949, Pankow ran for mayor, but lost the Democratic primary to Judge John Hillery. Hillery lost the general election to Republican Joseph Mruk. In 1950, Pankow was a delegate to the state Democratic Convention. In 1951, Pankow was narrowly defeated for reelection as county clerk, but his strong showing in Buffalo indicated his viability as a mayoral candidate. He was a delegate to the 1952 Democratic National Convention.

=== Mayor of Buffalo ===
In 1952, Pankow announced he would be a candidate for mayor in 1953. In the Democratic primary, Pankow defeated city council president Elmer Lux and city council member Peter J. Crotty for the nomination. In the general election Pankow's Republican opponent was Harold Becker, the city fire commissioner. On November 3, 1953, Pankow defeated Becker by a vote of 93,206 to 90,490 for Becker and 4,304 for Liberal nominee Richard Lipsitz.

During Pankow's term, the Buffalo Skyway was extended to erect a wider bridge over the Union Ship Canal. In addition, the Kensington Expressway, the Niagara Thruway extension and the Scajaquada Creek Expressway were constructed.

Though elected with the strong support of Buffalo's Polish-Americans, as mayor Pankow move beyond the politics of ethnic bloc voting by appointing Joseph Decillis as the city's first Italian-American police commissioner. He also began to surmount gender barriers when he named Ann Mikoll as a judge of Buffalo's City Court.

Pankow's additional accomplishments included creation of the city's Port Authority, the creation of a Youth Board to consider projects and programs aimed at the city's children and teenagers, and revitalization of the Police Athletic League baseball program. Pankow was also credited with starting paid medical insurance for city workers and construction of seven police and fire stations.

== Later life ==
Mayors of Buffalo were limited at the time to one four-year term. After the end of Pankow's term in 1957, he held a number of positions with the city government, including one with the Board of Assessors. He also owned various businesses including nightclubs and a liquor store.

Between 1959 and 1963, Pankow was indicted and tried several times for federal and state charges including bribery and tax evasion. Several proceedings resulted in mistrials, and the retrials ended with acquittals. He was never convicted of any of the charges.

In later life, Pankow maintained his interest in politics, and mounted quixotic campaigns for offices including mayor and Erie County Executive. He did not exert the same political influence he had previously, and these campaigns were unsuccessful.

== Death and burial ==
Panko retired in 1977 and continued to reside in Buffalo. He died in Buffalo on July 25, 1993. Pankow was buried at Mount Calvary Cemetery in Cheektowaga, New York.

== Family ==
In 1930, Panko married Mary Conwall (née Konowalczuk; 1912–2002). They were married until his death and had no children.

Political offices
Preceded by Joseph Mruk	Mayor of Buffalo, New York; 1954–1957	Succeeded by Frank A. Sedita
Preceded by Harry C. Vackel	County Clerk of Erie County, New York; 1949–1951	Succeeded by Edwin A. Rath
