= Ebenezer Johnson =

First mayor of Buffalo, New York

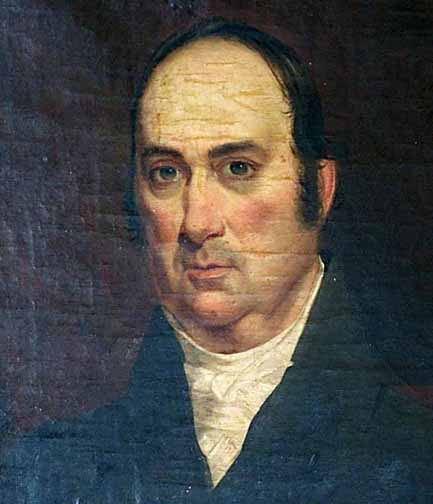
- Portrait of Ebenezer Johnson

1st and 3rd Mayor of Buffalo
- In office May 1832 – March 1833, 1834–1835
- Preceded by: Office established
- Succeeded by: Major Andre Andrews, Hiram Pratt

Personal details
- Born: November 7, 1786 New England
- Died: September 23, 1849 (aged 62) Tellico Plains, Tennessee
- Party: Democratic-Republican
- Spouse(s): Sally M. Johnson (m. 1811–1834) Lucy E. Lord Johnson (m. 1835)
- Children: 6

Ebenezer Johnson (November 7, 1786 – September 23, 1849) was an American businessman and politician. He served as the first mayor of Buffalo, New York, from May 1832 – March 1833 and 1834–1835.

== Early life ==
Ebenezer Johnson was born in New England on November 7, 1786. He studied medicine in Cherry Valley, New York, with Dr. Joseph White, a well-known physician of the time.

== Career ==
He came to Buffalo in 1810 where he began a medical practice and eventually opened a drug store.

During the War of 1812, he was appointed "surgeon's mate," or assistant surgeon. From 1823 on, Johnson had many business dealings including banking and bought property throughout the city.

On May 28, 1832 the first election in Buffalo took place and under the first city charter, the Common Council had the power to elect the mayor. Dr. Ebenezer Johnson was elected the first mayor of Buffalo with a salary of $250 ($8,063 in 2025) per year and his political affiliation was Democrat-Republican. During his term he established the first hospital, the McHose House, for the care of cholera patients. Johnson served as mayor from May 1832 to March 1833. He declined a second term. He did accept his re-election in 1834, serving a second and final term ending in 1835.

Dr. Johnson owned a parcel of land on Delaware Street, from Chippewa to Tupper, now known as "Johnson Park" and located in the West Village Historic District. His land was approximately 25 acres (10 ha) total. It was surrounded by a high fence and he allowed wild animals to live freely within its limits. His home was known as "Johnson Cottage," or just "the Cottage," and was a well-known place for socializing. The property included fruit orchards, vegetable gardens, flower beds, and elm trees.

After his second term, he moved to Tellico Plains, Tennessee, where he owned an iron ore mine with his brother, Elisha Johnson, who was a former mayor of Rochester, New York.

== Personal life ==
On January 25, 1811, he married Sally M. Johnson at Cherry Valley. She died in June 1834, and on December 7, 1835, he married Lucy E. Lord.

== Death ==
Johnson died at Tellico Plains on September 23, 1849.

Political offices
Preceded by none	Mayor of Buffalo, NY; 1832–1833	Succeeded by Major Andre Andrews
Preceded by Major Andre Andrews	Mayor of Buffalo, NY; 1834–1835	Succeeded by Hiram Pratt
