= Edgar B. Jewett =

American politician (1843–1924)

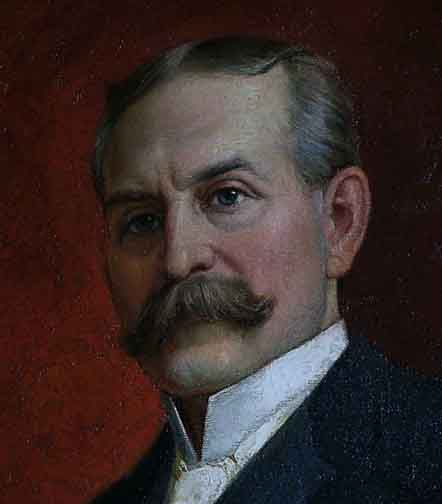
- Portrait of Edgar B. Jewett

42nd Mayor of Buffalo
- In office 1895–1897
- Preceded by: Charles F. Bishop
- Succeeded by: Conrad Diehl

Personal details
- Born: Edgar Boardman Jewett; December 14, 1843 Ann Arbor, Michigan, U.S.
- Died: March 28, 1924 (aged 80) Clifton Springs, New York, U.S.
- Party: Republican
- Spouse(s): Elizabeth Foster Danforth, Augusta Elizabeth Fisher
- Children: 4

Edgar Boardman Jewett (December 14, 1843 – March 28, 1924) was mayor of the city of Buffalo, New York, United States, from 1895–1897. He was born in Ann Arbor, Michigan on December 14, 1843. He died on March 28, 1924, while at Clifton Springs, New York, and was buried in Forest Lawn Cemetery.

== Family ==
In 1849, Jewett's family moved to Buffalo, New York. His father, John Cotton Jewett, established a company to manufacture refrigerators and later other household conveniences including ice chests, porcelain-lined coolers, water coolers, toiletware, birdcages, spittoons, bathing apparatus, and hospital and laboratory equipment. Edgar married Elizabeth Foster Danforth on October 3, 1865. They had four children and lived at a home built at 210 Summer Street. Elizabeth died in 1905, and Jewett remarried to Augusta Elizabeth Fisher in 1909.

== National Guard service ==
In 1861, Jewett joined the New York National Guard as a private in Company C of the Seventy-fourth Regiment, under the leadership of William Findlay Rogers. He returned to Buffalo as first sergeant on June 29, 1865 and was commissioned first lieutenant. The last position he achieved as a member of the New York National Guard was that of brigadier general of the 8th Brigade, on March 29, 1884.

== Public office ==
On March 1, 1894, Mayor Charles F. Bishop appointed Jewett to the Board of Police Commissioners for a term of five years. Jewett was elected mayor on November 6, 1894, as the Republican candidate. During his term, Masten Park High School and 11 other schools were built. On March 1, 1897, he signed documents making the Buffalo Library free. He also signed a bill providing a piece of park property for the Buffalo History Museum building. He was not chosen as the Republican candidate at the 1896 party convention.

== Industrialist ==
Jewett was president and general manager of the John C. Jewett & Son company from 1885–1917. From 1917–1924, he continued his position with the Jewett Refrigerator Company at 27 Chandler Street. He became vice-president of the Cary Safe Company, and was elected president of Columbia National Bank of Buffalo in 1897.

Political offices
Preceded by Charles F. Bishop	Mayor of Buffalo, NY; 1895–1897	Succeeded by Conrad Diehl
