= Cary Safe Company =

American safe company

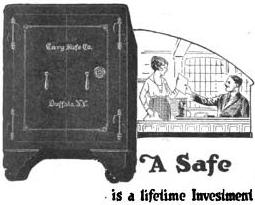
- Cary Safe Company (advertisement) for a double-door Cary safe (January 1920)
- Company type: Private
- Industry: Security technology
- Founded: 1878
- Founder: Horace D. Cary
- Defunct: 1929
- Fate: Defunct
- Headquarters: Buffalo, New York, United States
- Products: Safes, locks, bank vaults, safe deposit boxes, prison cells

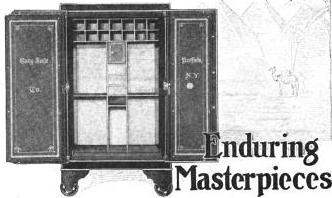

The Cary Safe Company is a defunct safe company that was established and located in Buffalo, New York.

== Products ==
The company manufactured and sold bank vaults, cabinets (safes), and safe deposit boxes from 1878 to 1929. A majority of the safes sold by Cary had letters painted to the purchaser's request on the upper portion of the safe. Typically common was a customer's family name or the name of a business. Every Cary safe was built fire and burglar-proof. The company also manufactured intricate time locks and combination locks, (standard key) locks, and prison cells.

== History ==
Although founded in 1878, the company wasn't incorporated until 1889. Members of the old firm continued with the new company.

These members include:

President	Horace D. Cary
Vice President	Edgar B. Jewett
Secretary	Sherman L. Cary
Treasurer	Albert W. Smith
Superintendent	J. H. Goehler

The company also employed a number of traveling salesmen around the United States.

== Slogans ==
Popular company advertising slogans included:

- "Growing Great Since Seventy Eight"
- CARY SAFES "The Safe Investment"
- "Uniform Strength Throughout"

== Locations ==
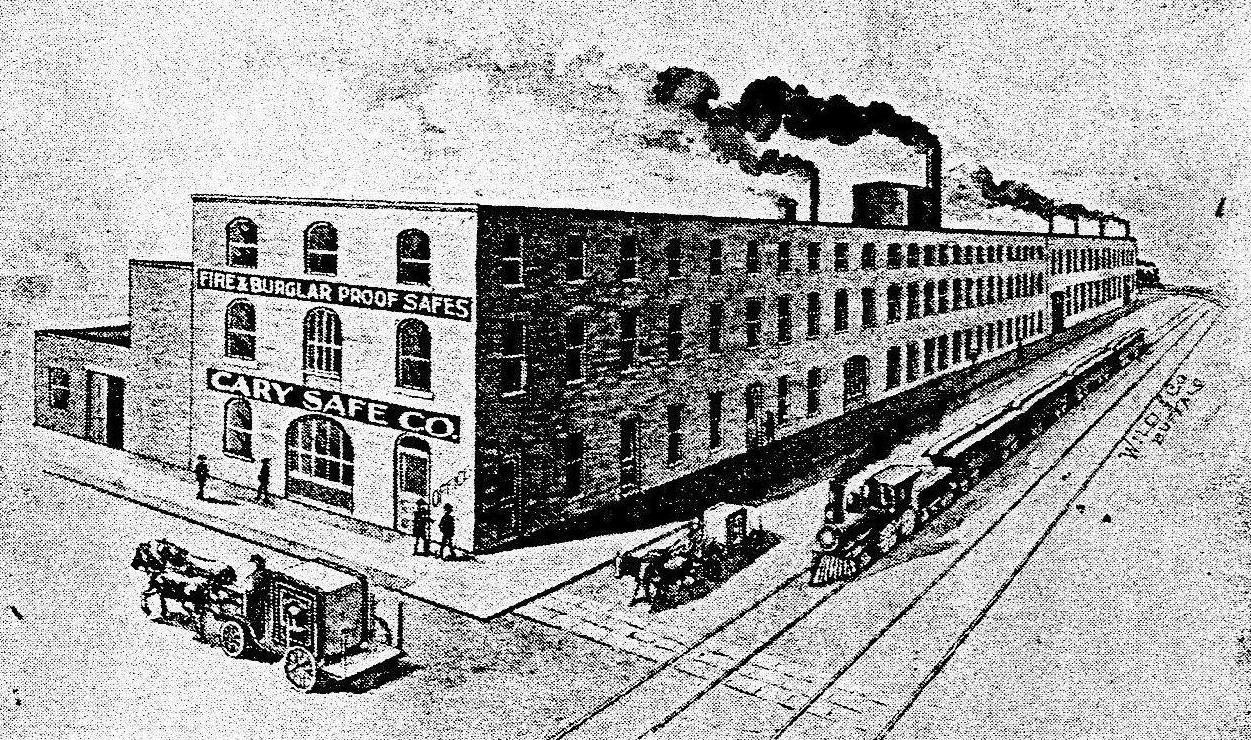
Cary Safe Company production building

The company's headquarters, which included production and office buildings, was located in a 1.5-acre (0.61 ha), three-story building, at the corner of 250-266 Chicago Street and 217–249 Scott Street. In the 1920s a service and sales building was opened at 1200 Niagara Street.
