= Conrad Diehl =

American politician

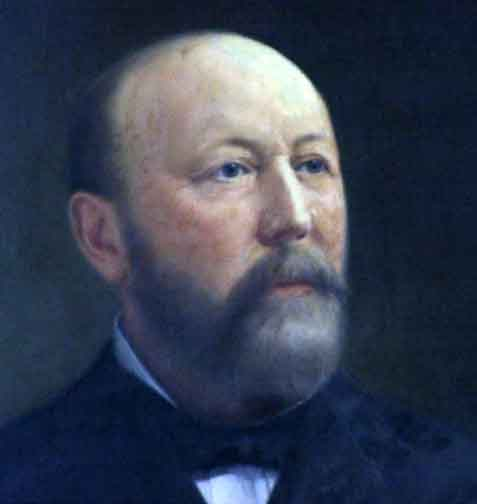

43rd Mayor of Buffalo
- In office 1898–1901
- Preceded by: Edgar B. Jewett
- Succeeded by: Erastus C. Knight

Personal details
- Born: July 17, 1843 Buffalo, New York, U.S.
- Died: February 20, 1918 (aged 74) Buffalo, New York, U.S.
- Party: Democratic
- Spouse: Caroline Trautmann (m. 1869; died 1888) Lois Masten (m. 1892)
- Children: 3

Conrad Diehl (July 17, 1843 – February 20, 1918) was an American physician and politician who served as mayor of Buffalo, New York, from 1898 to 1901. He was born in Buffalo on July 17, 1843. He graduated from the University of Buffalo with a medical degree in 1866. On May 5, 1869, he married Caroline Trautmann in New York City; she died in 1888 and he remarried in 1892 to Lois Masten, head nurse at Buffalo General Hospital. From 1870 to 1878, he was surgeon and major of the 65th Regiment, of the New York National Guard. From 1874 on, he was either attending or consulting physician at Buffalo General Hospital.

Diehl's first elected office was that of coroner, which he won by a large majority in 1867. He finished his three-year term and declined renomination. In 1874, Diehl was appointed attending physician at the General Hospital, and then consulting physician. He returned to public office in 1892 as the first president of the Board of School Examiners, on which he served until 1896.

Diehl was elected mayor of Buffalo on November 2, 1897, as the Democratic candidate. In 1898, an amendment to extend the mayor's term to four years was adopted. During his term, the first successful generation and transmission of electricity by the power of Niagara Falls was brought to Buffalo. In addition, the city was in the throes of preparing for the Pan-American Exposition. Diehl had formally invited President William McKinley to the Exposition and was with him when he was assassinated by Leon Czolgosz.

He did not run for re-election. After his term, he returned to private life and his medical practice. He died on February 20, 1918.

Political offices
Preceded by Edgar B. Jewett	Mayor of Buffalo, NY; 1898–1901	Succeeded by Erastus C. Knight
