= Joseph J. Kelly =

American politician (1897–1963)

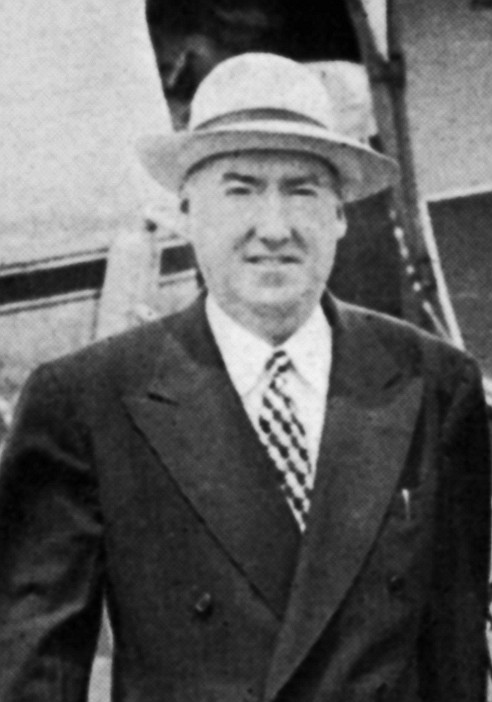
- Kelley in 1943

52nd Mayor of Buffalo
- In office 1942–1945
- Preceded by: Thomas L. Holling
- Succeeded by: Bernard J. Dowd

Personal details
- Born: July 5, 1897 Buffalo, New York, U.S.
- Died: July 6, 1963 (aged 65) Buffalo, New York, U.S.
- Party: Democratic
- Spouse: Laura Campbell Stephenson

Joseph James Kelly (July 5, 1897 – July 7, 1963) was an American attorney and politician who served as the 52nd mayor of Buffalo, New York. He held the office from 1942 to 1945.

== Early life ==
Joseph James Kelly was born in Buffalo, New York, on July 5, 1897. His father was James W. Kelly, the founder of the American Body Company, and a local Democratic politician.

Kelly served with a training unit in World War I and then entered the University at Buffalo Law School, graduating in 1920. He spent several years as a trial lawyer before being endorsed by the Democratic Party for a 1933 run for City Court. He was approached to run for mayor in 1937 but declined in favor of remaining on the bench.

In 1940, Kelly was again approached with a request to run for mayor, this time accepting. The primary election was held on September 16, 1941, and Kelly defeated former Mayor Frank Schwab. William Fisher secured the Republican nomination.

== Career ==
In an election held on November 5, 1941, Kelly defeated Fisher in a close race and was sworn in on December 31.

In 1943, after noticing that there was only a single active black member in the Buffalo Police Force, Kelly called in members of the Civil Service Commission, and Buffalo Police Commissioner Charles E. Cannan, into his office and insisted that African Americans be certified for service in the Buffalo Police Department. This meeting led to the integration of 14 policemen and one policewoman temporarily onto the force. When servicemen who had been Buffalo police returned from World War II, they were reinstated at the cost of most of the temporary police force.

Kelly's term was largely uneventful until January 2, 1945, when the city experienced what was called the worst storm in its history.

When his term ended in 1945, Kelly opted not to run again, instead returning to private life.

Kelley later became the deputy comptroller of New York state.

== Personal life ==
Kelly was not married at any point during his public career, but on March 7, 1949, married Laura Campbell Stephenson; the two never had children.

On July 7, 1963, Joseph Kelly died in Buffalo General Hospital following a three-month-long illness.

Political offices
Preceded by Thomas L. Holling	Mayor of Buffalo, NY; 1942–1945	Succeeded by Bernard J. Dowd
