= Endorsement =

Endorsement (alternatively spelled "indorsement") may refer to a:

- testimonial, a written or spoken statement promoting or advertising a product
- political endorsement, publicly declaring support for a candidate
- form added to an insurance policy, to modify its terms
- signature on a negotiable instrument, such as a check
- blank endorsement, a signature given without indicating the instrument's payee
- note added to a driver's license, often to record a traffic offense

== See also ==
- Endorsement test, the separation between state and religion as tested by the United States Supreme Court
- Forged endorsement, a legal description of forged endorsement
