= George S. Buck =

American politician (1875–1931)

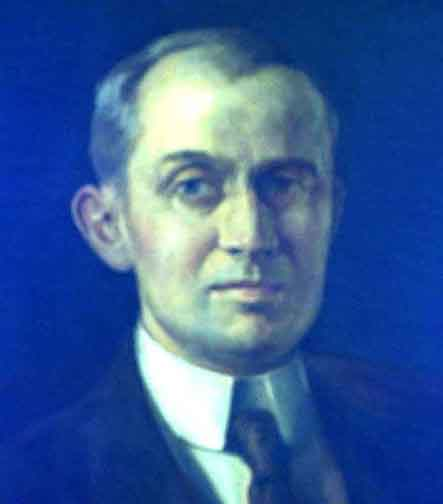
- Portrait of George S. Buck

47th Mayor of Buffalo
- In office 1918–1922
- Preceded by: Louis P. Fuhrmann
- Succeeded by: Frank X. Schwab

Personal details
- Born: February 10, 1875 Chicago, Illinois
- Died: July 5, 1931 (aged 56) Buffalo, New York
- Party: Republican
- Spouse: Ellen Louise Hussey
- Children: four children

George Sturgess Buck (1875–1931) was Mayor of the City of Buffalo, New York, serving 1918–1922. He was born in Chicago, Illinois, on February 10, 1875, and moved to Buffalo the following year. He graduated from Buffalo's Central High School in 1892, and received a B.A. from Yale University in 1896. He graduated from the Buffalo Law School in 1898, and was admitted to the bar the same year. He married Ellen Louise Hussey on October 6, 1903.

He was elected Mayor on November 6, 1917, as the Republican candidate. During his term, he worked to avert a strike by the International Railway Company (I.R.C.). In addition, he was active throughout World War I in fostering patriotism and aided the various war organizations in any way he could. Buck lost his bid for re-election on November 8, 1921. After his term as mayor was over, he returned to his law practice and became a director of the Buffalo City Planning Association. He died on July 5, 1931, and was buried in Forest Lawn Cemetery .

Political offices
Preceded by Louis P. Fuhrmann	Mayor of Buffalo, NY; 1918–1921	Succeeded by Frank X. Schwab
