= Frank A. Sedita =

American politician (1907–1975)

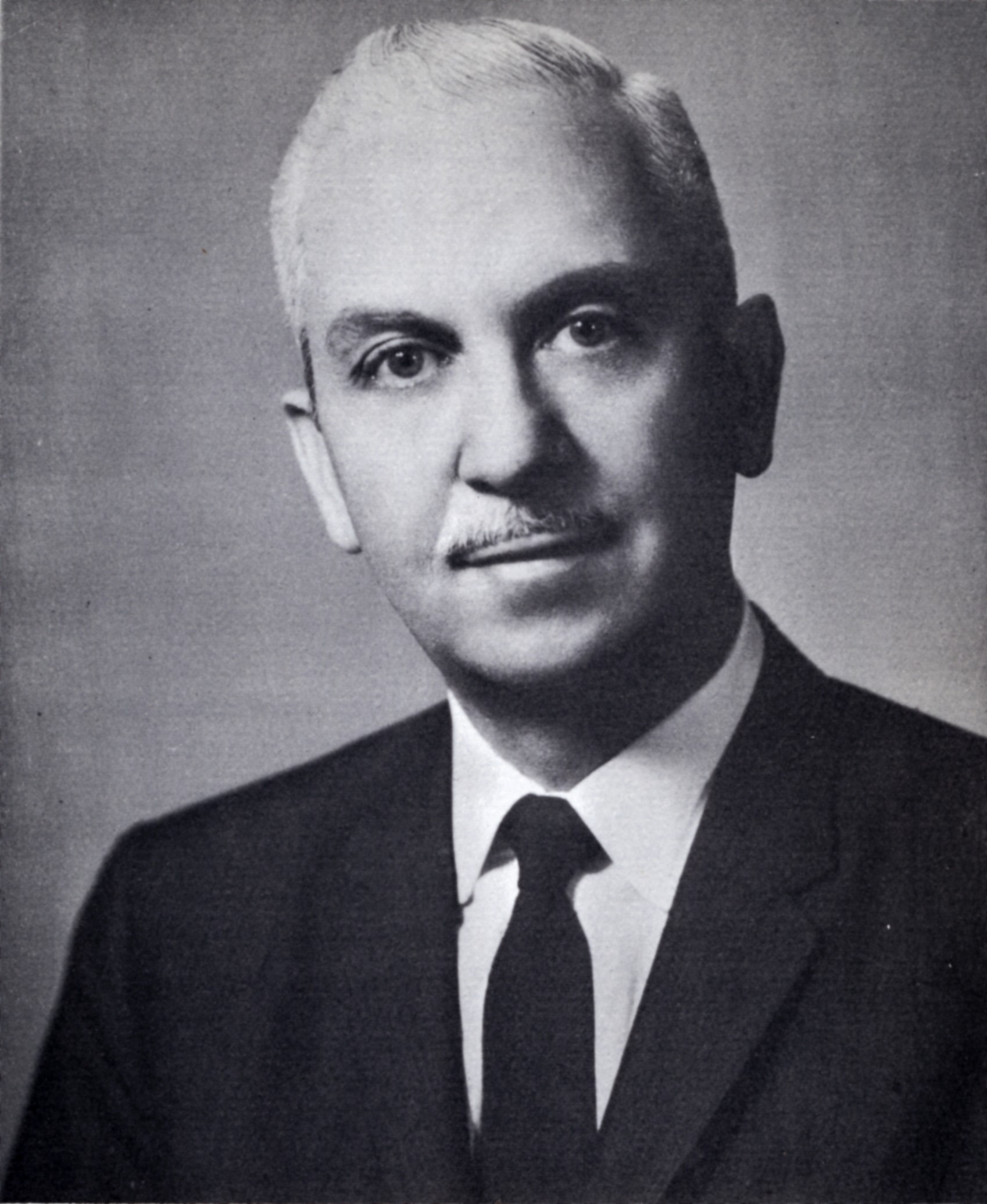

56th and 58th Mayor of Buffalo
- In office January 1, 1966 – March 5, 1973
- Preceded by: Chester A. Kowal
- Succeeded by: Stanley M. Makowski
- In office January 1, 1958 – December 31, 1961
- Preceded by: Steven Pankow
- Succeeded by: Chester A. Kowal

Personal details
- Born: June 20, 1907 New Orleans, Louisiana, U.S.
- Died: May 2, 1975 (aged 67) Buffalo, New York, U.S.
- Party: Democratic
- Spouse: Sarah Vacanti (m. 1935)
- Children: 2
- Education: Canisius College (BA); University of Buffalo (JD)

Frank Albert Sedita (June 20, 1907 – May 2, 1975) was an American attorney and politician who served as the 56th and 58th mayor of Buffalo, New York.

== Early life and education ==
He was born in New Orleans, Louisiana, on June 20, 1907. His family relocated to Buffalo, New York, in 1911. When he was 10, Sedita began selling newspapers and shining shoes around the Downtown Buffalo area. He attended Hutchinson Central High School and spent his summers working in canning factories and on farms in Wilson and Lyndonville, New York.

Sedita received a Bachelor of Arts from Canisius College. In 1931, he received his Juris Doctor degree from the University of Buffalo Law School.

== Career ==
In 1950, Sedita was elected as a City Court judge. He resigned from his job on the City Court bench on September 6, 1957 to pursue his mayoral bid. On November 5, 1957, he was elected mayor, defeating incumbent Steven Pankow. During this term, urban renewal was continued and the Ellicott District Project was completed. He lost his bid for re-election to mayor in the November 7, 1961 election, when Chester A. Kowal was elected mayor. In 1962, President John F. Kennedy nominated Sedita to the post of Federal Customs Collector of the Port of Buffalo; he held that post until May 7, 1965. He was elected as mayor to a second term on November 2, 1965.

At the 1966 Democratic State Convention, held in Buffalo Memorial Auditorium, he was nominated to run for New York State Attorney General. He was defeated in the general election by Louis J. Lefkowitz. In June 1967, during the Buffalo riot at the Michigan Avenue YMCA, the mayor faced an angry crowd of young African Americans during an East Side street confrontation. He was re-elected on November 4, 1969. He ran for Erie County executive in 1971, but was defeated by Edward Regan in the general election. Because of health concerns, on February 8, 1973 Sedita submitted a letter of resignation to the Buffalo Common Council, to become effective on March 5, 1973.

== Personal life ==
He married Sarah Vacanti on July 11, 1934.

He died on May 2, 1975, aged 67, and was buried in Forest Lawn Cemetery. On December 14, 1987, Buffalo Public School 30 was renamed Frank A. Sedita Community School.

Sedita's son, Frank A. Sedita, Jr., was a judge on the New York State Supreme Court. His grandson, Frank A. Sedita III, was twice elected District Attorney of Erie County and is now a judge on the New York State Supreme Court.

Political offices
Preceded by Steven Pankow	Mayor of Buffalo, NY; 1958–1961	Succeeded by Chester A. Kowal
Preceded by Chester A. Kowal	Mayor of Buffalo, NY; 1966–1973	Succeeded by Stanley M. Makowski
Party political offices
Preceded by Edward R. Dudley	Democratic Nominee for New York State Attorney General; 1966	Succeeded by Adam Walinsky
