= Chester Kowal =

American politician (1904–1966)

Chester A. Kowal
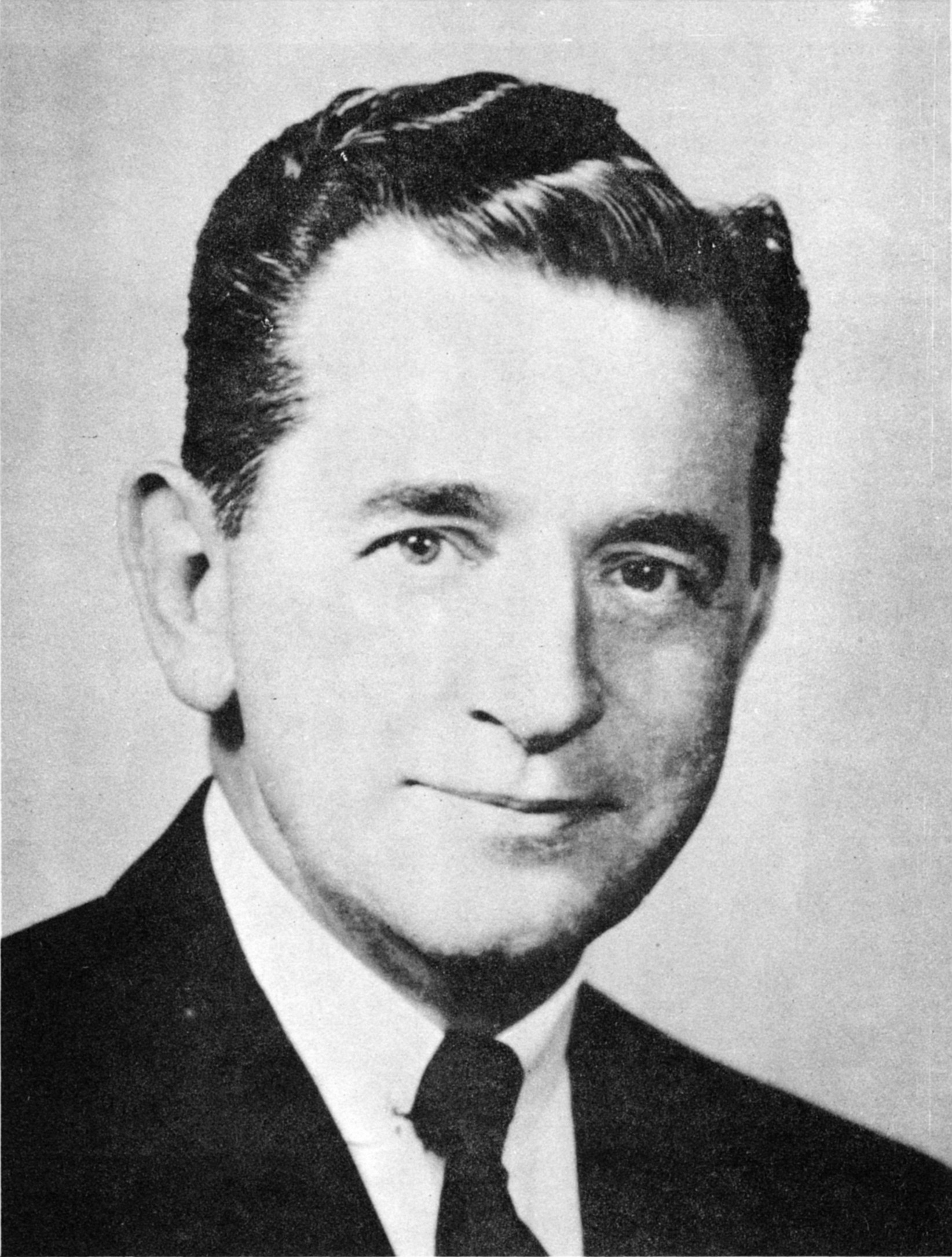
- Kowal, c. 1962

57th Mayor of Buffalo
- In office January 1, 1962 – December 31, 1965
- Preceded by: Frank A. Sedita
- Succeeded by: Frank A. Sedita

Personal details
- Born: August 17, 1904 Buffalo, New York, U.S.
- Died: September 28, 1966 (aged 62) Buffalo, New York, U.S.
- Party: Republican
- Spouse: Stephanie Adamski
- Children: 2
- Military career
- Allegiance: United States
- Branch: Army Air Corps
- Service years: 1942–1946
- Rank: Lieutenant colonel
- Conflicts: World War II; Pacific War

Chester A. Kowal (né Kowalczewski; August 17, 1904 – September 28, 1966) was an American politician, a basketball player, a boxer and a World War II veteran. From 1962 to 1965 he was mayor of Buffalo, New York; he was the last non-Democratic mayor of that city until Byron Brown temporarily switched parties in 2021.

== Biography ==
Born in Buffalo on August 17, 1904, Chester A. Kowalczewski was the oldest of eight children born to a Polish-American Catholic couple, Katherine (née Kotas) and John Kowalczewski, a blacksmith. John later shortened the family name to combat anti-Polish sentiment while searching for employment. The family operated a grocery store at 55 Gittere Street. He attended Hutchinson Central High School. He turned down a basketball scholarship to Canisius College in Buffalo in order to play professionally to earn money. He played with the once world champion German Orioles and the Buffalo Lincolns basketball teams, and also played semi-pro baseball with the Easter Brands. He boxed with the Western New York AAU, and tried out for the U.S. Olympic boxing team. He was married to a Polish-American woman, Stephanie Adamski. His family started Walden Bottling Works in 1924; he managed the company in his spare time.

In late 1942, he enlisted in the United States Army Air Forces as a private and was sent to Officers' Training School. He spent five months of his service in the Pacific Theater during World War II. In April 1946, he was discharged as a lieutenant colonel. He was active in veterans organizations.

In 1951, Kowal was elected Buffalo city comptroller on the Republican ticket. He was defeated in his run for mayor in the 1957 election by Frank A. Sedita, but prevailed in the mayoral election held on November 7, 1961. He served a single term as mayor. On September 28, 1966, he died in his sleep. Shortly before his death, he was indicted on charges relating to a garbage collection scandal in the city.

Political offices
Preceded by Frank A. Sedita	Mayor of Buffalo, New York; 1962 – 1965	Succeeded by Frank A. Sedita
