= Hiram Pratt =

American politician

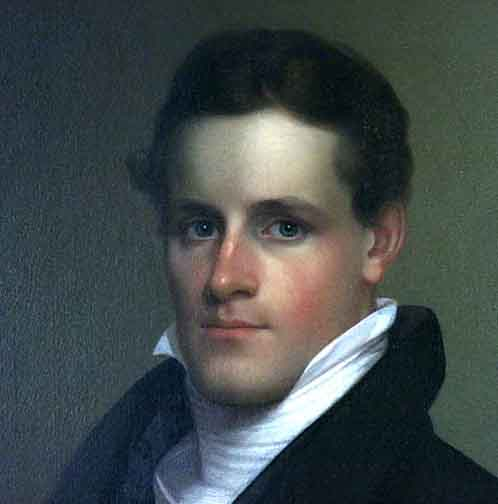
- Portrait of Hiram Pratt

9th Mayor of Buffalo
- In office 1839–1840
- Preceded by: Ebenezer Walden
- Succeeded by: Sheldon Thompson

4th Mayor of Buffalo
- In office 1835–1836
- Preceded by: Ebenezer Johnson
- Succeeded by: Samuel Wilkeson

Personal details
- Born: June 28, 1800 Westminster, Vermont
- Died: April 27, 1840 (aged 39) Utica, New York
- Party: Whig
- Spouse: Maria Fowle
- Children: three children

Hiram Pratt (June 28, 1800 – April 27, 1840) was an American politician and mayor of Buffalo, New York, serving 1835–1836 and 1839–1840.

== Early life ==
Pratt was born in Westminster, Vermont, on June 28, 1800, and moved to Buffalo as a child with his family. He was a son of Captain Samuel Pratt, an early settler of Buffalo. He married Maria Fowler on December 10, 1825. They had three daughters.

== Career ==
With Orlando Allen, Pratt built a mercantile business, a warehouse and forwarding business, and was an agent for the Farmers Fire Insurance and Loan Company. A founder, cashier, and president of the first Bank of Buffalo, he was a leading Great Lakes shipbuilder; and a Trustee of the village of Buffalo.

On March 10, 1835, the Buffalo Common Council appointed Pratt as Mayor of the city. During his first term the city purchased land for the Elk Street Market. On March 5, 1839, he was elected for a second term. During this term six new school buildings were erected and competent teachers hired and a Recorder's Court was created. In January 1840, the New York State legislature passed a law requiring all mayors in New York to be elected directly by the people, making him the last mayor elected by the Common Council.

During the financial depression of 1836–1838, Pratt lost his entire estate largely to forged notes and the speculative projects undertaken by Benjamin Rathbun. He never fully recovered from the emotional strain.

== Death ==
Pratt died in Utica, New York, on April 27, 1840, en route to Saratoga, New York, for rest. His body was returned to Buffalo and he is interred at Forest Lawn Cemetery. Buffalo's Prospect Park stands on property once owned by Pratt.

Political offices
| Preceded by Ebenezer Johnson | Mayor of Buffalo, NY; 1835–1836 | Succeeded by Samuel Wilkeson |
| Preceded by Ebenezer Walden | Mayor of Buffalo, NY; 1839–1840 | Succeeded by Sheldon Thompson |
