= Seal of Buffalo, New York =

Municipal seal

- Armiger: Christopher Scanlon, Mayor of Buffalo
- Adopted: 1939
- Supporter: None
- Use: Municipal flag, official correspondence, insignia of city agencies and institutions

The municipal seal of Buffalo is the official seal of the City of Buffalo, United States. The seal contains a historic depiction of Buffalo harbor surrounded by the legend, "Seal of the City of Buffalo."

== History ==
=== First seal ===
Though founded in 1831, the City of Buffalo did not have an official seal until 1919.

Upon a request by the Julius Bien Company in New York City to provide a description of the municipal banner, the Common Council adopted its first official flag and seal.

The official seal was described by the Common Council: “To the left center lighthouse on pier with ship passing it into harbor. To the lower right canal boat passing into canal to the right surrounded in circle by the legend ‘City of Buffalo, Incorporated 1832.’”

=== Two seals ===
The city flag, also established, was meant to incorporate the official city seal. When produced though, the flag did not include the seal passed by the Common Council. Instead, the seal illustrated a slightly different port scene, the pier and the ship were different, and two port animals drag the canal boat into harbor the opposite direction.

By 1930, the seal ordinance that was passed in 1912 had been omitted by the Common Council. For the next ten years, Buffalo was again without an official city seal. Instead, until 1939 with the ordinance of a new official seal, Buffalo would have two unofficial seals in circulation. One seal, that established by the Common Council in 1912 was used by most departments in City Hall. The other seal, the one appearing on the flag and surrounded by the legend, “Seal of the City of Buffalo,” was used on all official documents of the Mayor and Comptroller.

=== Current seal ===
Early in 1939 a Buffalo News articles revealed that Buffalo lacked an official seal and brought the two seal discrepancy to the public eye. Just two days later the Common Council proposed a new official seal, the Mayoral version. By mid November the new seal was certified and by mid December it was repealed. It was determined that additional stonecutting costs would total $3,200 if the new design was placed on the façade of Convention Hall, therefore the seal was repealed.

Eight days after its repeal, the ordinance detailing the seal was reinstated. The official seal of the City of Buffalo was described: “To the left center, lighthouse on pier; to the right of the lighthouse, ship with three masts showing sails; to the lower right, canal boat drawn by two draft animals proceeding in direction leading toward or past pier; the above, all, surrounded by a double circle and between said circles appearing the words ‘SEAL OF THE CITY OF BUFFALO.’" It appears that the current seal is an evolved form of a former Buffalo seal from the mid 19th century.
