= Kamman Building =

Historic commercial building in New York, United States

- The Kamman Building
- U.S. National Register of Historic Places
- New York State Register of Historic Places
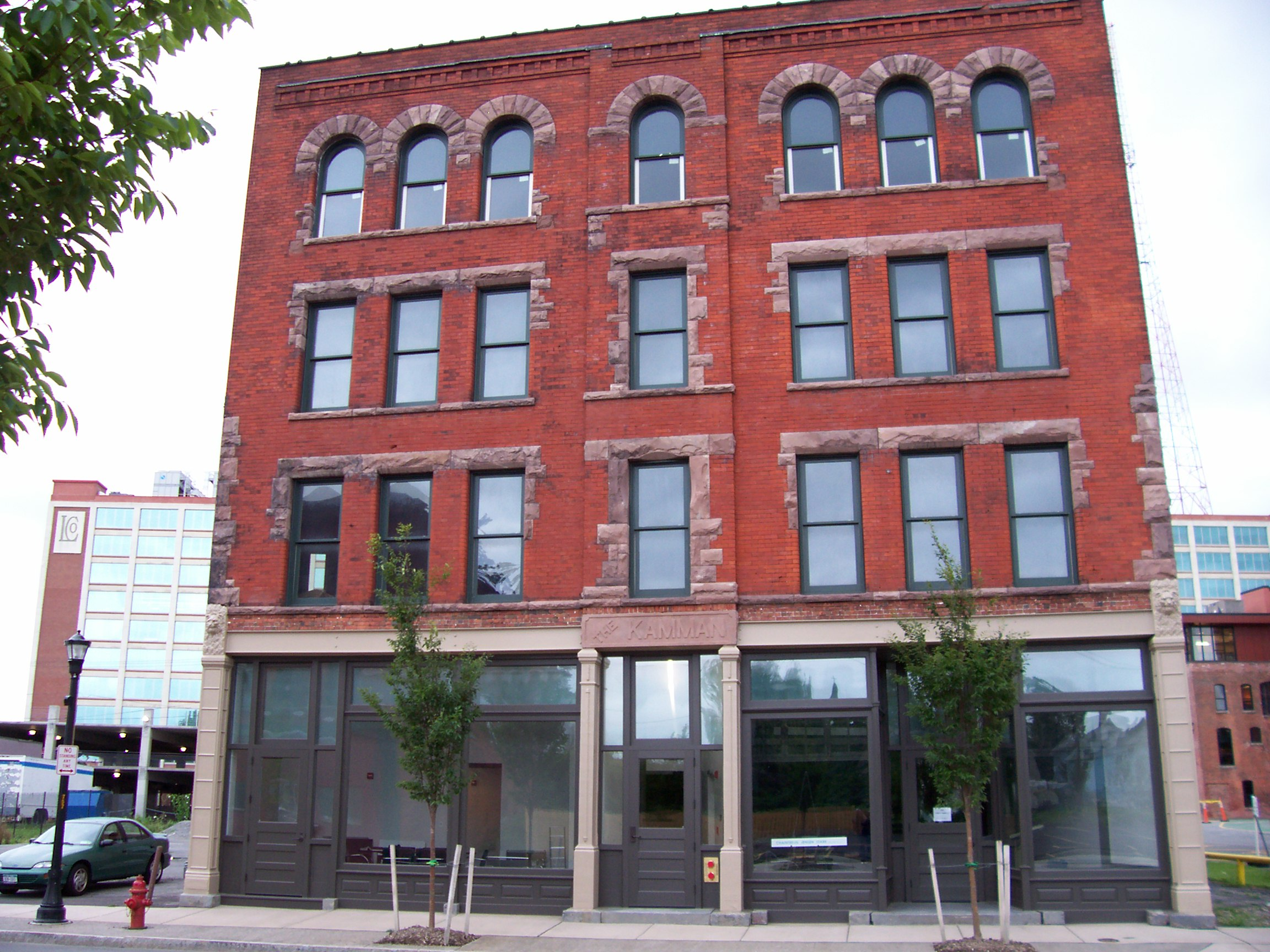
- The Kamman Building, September 2011

- Location within New York Location within the United States
- Location: 755 Seneca St., Buffalo, New York
- Coordinates: 42°52′33″N 78°50′57″W
- Area: 0.18 acres (0.073 ha)
- Built: 1883
- Architect: Frank Wellington (F.W.) Caulkins
- Architectural style: Romanesque Revival
- MPS: Historic Resources of the Hydraulics/Larkin Neighborhood MPS
- NRHP reference No.: 10000043
- NYSRHP No.: 02940.028056

Significant dates
- Added to NRHP: March 1, 2010
- Designated NYSRHP: January 5, 2010

The John F. Kamman Building is a historic commercial building located at Buffalo in Erie County, New York. It designed by Buffalo architect F.W. Caulkins and built in 1883. A four-story brick building, it was designed in the Romanesque Renaissance style. The Kamman Building is located within the Hydraulics Neighborhood, Buffalo's oldest manufacturing district. A post office substation was located in the building starting in 1893. The building was listed on the National Register of Historic Places in 2010.

A 4-story building of "7-rank brick" and Medina sandstone it has a ground floor storefront featuring cast iron pilasters, a lion head ornament and a "The Kamman" sign above the door.

The property was owned by the Kamman family until 1916, when it was sold to the Larkin Company.

The building's location in the Hydraulics area was near the large livestock yards and rail lines booming in the nineteenth-century (Buffalo was second only to Chicago in the number of cattle and hogs it handled). German butchers such as the Kamman family (immigrants who arrived in the mid-1800s) established themselves. Henry Kamman ran a butcher shop at 573-575 Seneca Street and Jefferson Avenue while brother John F. Kamman purchased property in the 700 block of Seneca during the 1850s and early 1860s and built the J. F. Kamman Slaughterhouse including barns, processing buildings, and sheds. The family also lived on the property. The Kamman Building was constructed around 1886 by John F. Kamman at 755-757 Seneca Street. John H. Kamman (son of Henry) continued the trade and the John H. Kamman Company was built into one of the city's largest meat markets and grocery store chains (including more than 30 stores). The Kamman Building at 757 Seneca Street was home to one of the markets in 1903.

== Gallery ==
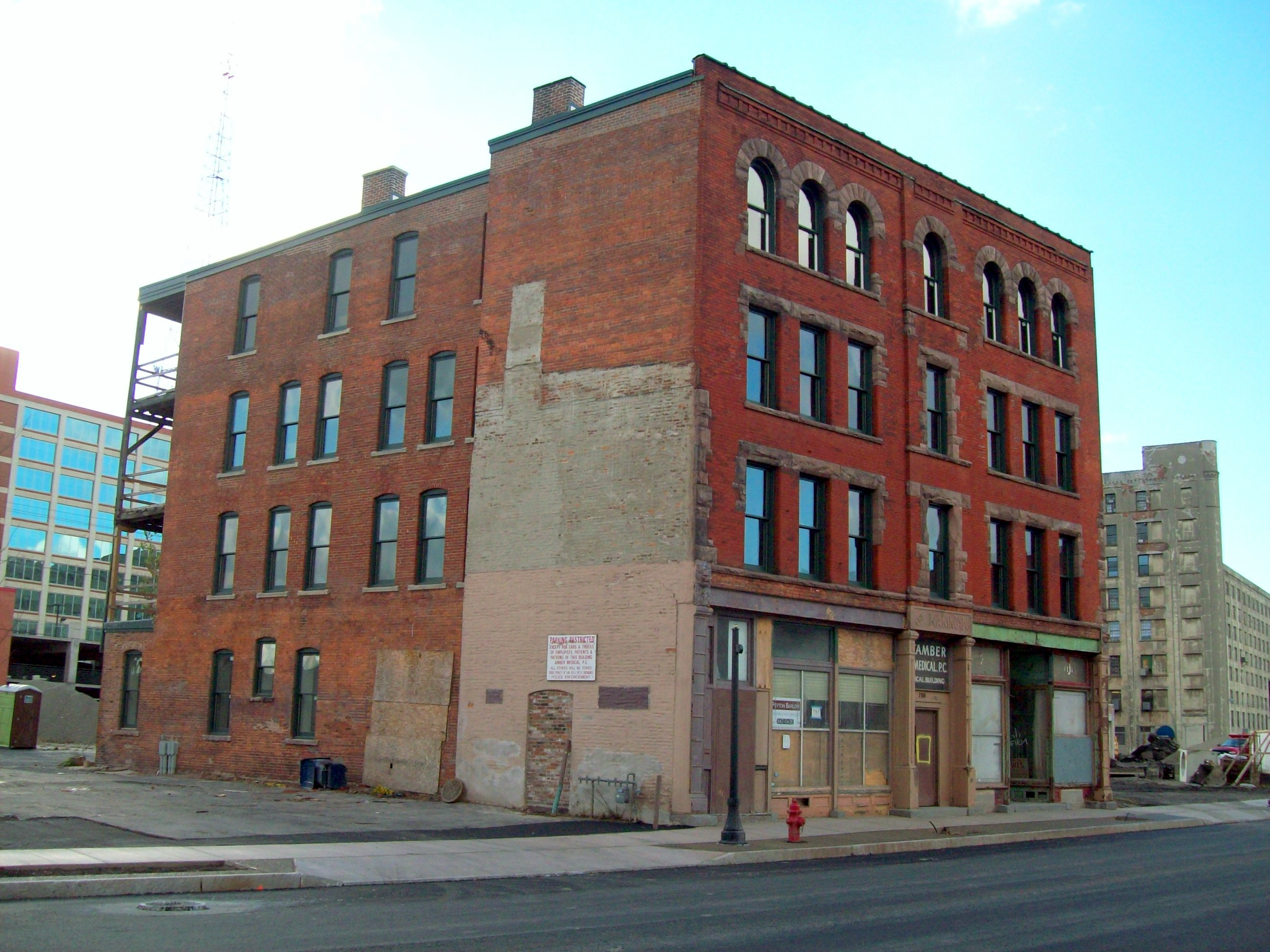
The Kamman Building, side view, November 2010
