= Charles F. Bishop =

American politician (1844–1913)

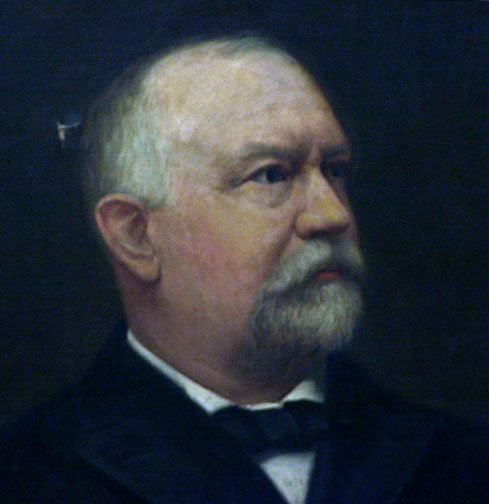

41st Mayor of Buffalo
- In office 1890–1894
- Preceded by: Philip Becker
- Succeeded by: Edgar B. Jewett

Personal details
- Born: October 14, 1844 Williamsville, New York
- Died: September 14, 1913 (aged 68) Buffalo, New York
- Party: Democratic
- Spouse: Kate Moran

Charles Frederick Bishop (October 14, 1844 – September 14, 1913) was the mayor of Buffalo, New York, serving from 1890 to 1894. He was born in Williamsville, New York, on October 14, 1844. At an early age, his parents moved to Buffalo. He married Kate Moran on August 6, 1865. In 1869, he established a wholesale coffee, tea, and spice store at 80 Main Street.

He was elected mayor of Buffalo on November 6, 1889, as the Democratic candidate. He was reelected to a second term on November 3, 1891. After his second term was completed, Bishop returned to his private business. On September 14, 1913, he died in his home and was buried in Forest Lawn Cemetery.

Political offices
Preceded by Philip Becker	Mayor of Buffalo, NY; 1890–1894	Succeeded by Edgar B. Jewett
