= Bernard J. Dowd =

American politician

- Dowd, c. 1951

53rd Mayor of Buffalo
- In office 1946–1949
- Preceded by: Joseph J. Kelly
- Succeeded by: Joseph Mruk

Personal details
- Born: December 5, 1891 Buffalo, New York, U.S.
- Died: November 1, 1971 (aged 79) Buffalo, New York, U.S.
- Party: Republican
- Spouse: Grace J. Nolan

Bernard J. Dowd (1891–1971) was Mayor of the City of Buffalo, New York, serving 1946–1949. He was born in Buffalo's First Ward on December 5, 1891. He graduated from high school around 1915 and entered the University of Buffalo School of Pharmacy. He entered World War I in May 1918 as a sergeant in Company G, 309th Infantry, 78 Division. He was gassed in the Battle of Saint-Mihiel and reported dead. In May 1919, Dowd returned to Buffalo honorably discharged from the service. He graduated from pharmacy school and opened Dowd's Pharmacy located after 1940 at 110 Potomac Avenue, at the corner of DeWitt Street. He married Grace J. Nolan on October 22, 1922.

Dowd was elected mayor on November 6, 1945, as the Republican candidate. On May 9, 1946, Mayor Dowd was in Washington, D.C., where he met President Harry S. Truman and accepted the National Safety Council award for "safest large city in 1945." After his term ended, he worked as a pharmacist. He was defeated in the 1951 Republican primary for Common Council President. He died on November 1, 1971, in Veteran's Hospital after a long illness.

Political offices
Preceded by Joseph J. Kelly	Mayor of Buffalo, NY; 1946–1949	Succeeded by Joseph Mruk
