= Benjamin Rathbun =

American entrepreneur (1790–1873)

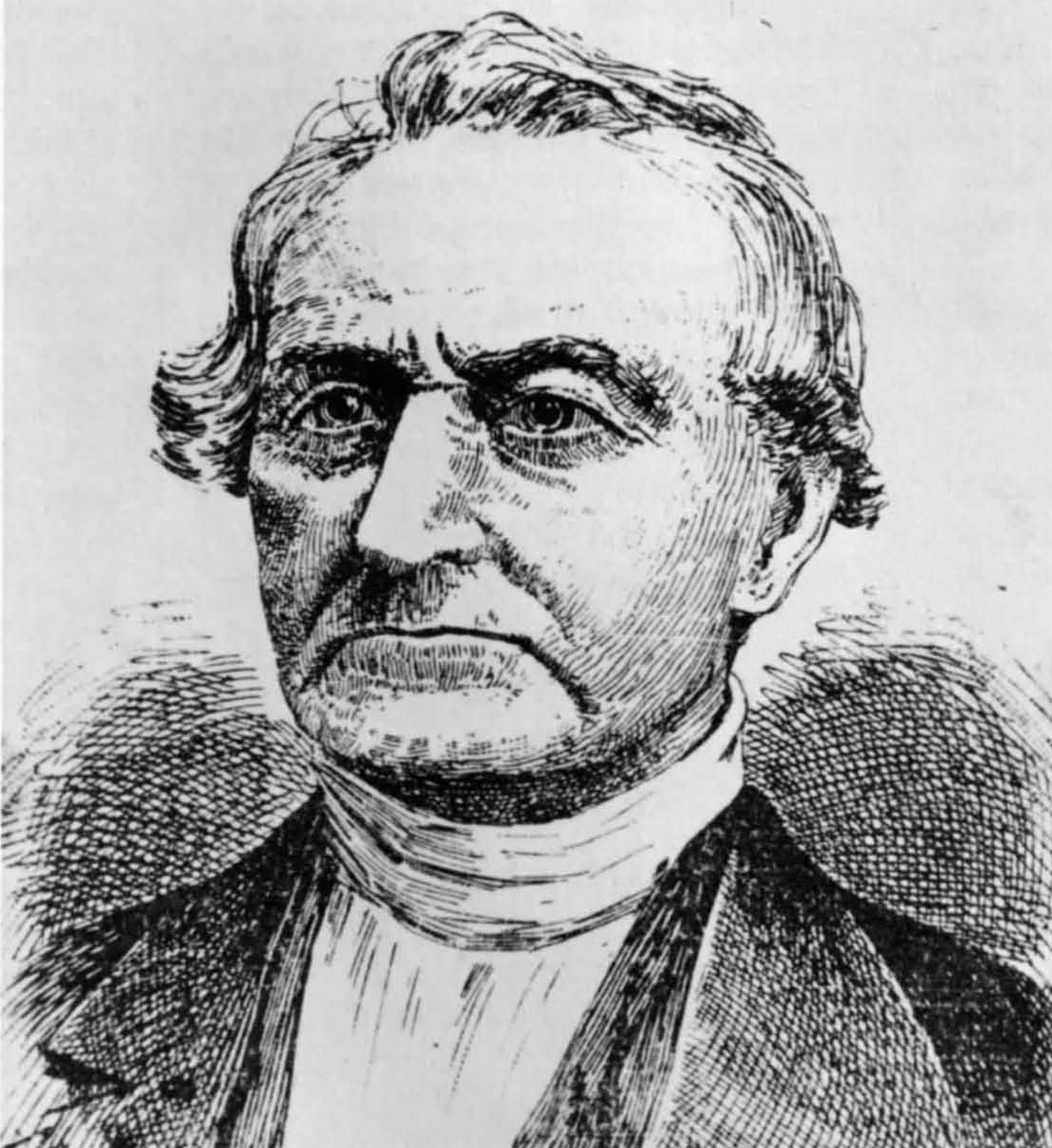
1888 illustration

Benjamin Rathbun (December 1, 1790 – July 20, 1873) was an American entrepreneur from Buffalo, New York. He was born in the area of Westford, Connecticut. His family had settled in New York from Connecticut. Before entering real estate, his Eagle Tavern served those who were traveling between Buffalo and Albany. In the 19th century, he built out the city's central business district and many other areas of the city, totaling hundreds of buildings. These included a fourteen-floor warehouse, dozens of low-rise buildings, a hotel, and nearly three dozen private dwellings. His investors were looking to capitalize on the explosive growth of Buffalo after the Erie Canal was finished. Rathbun drew inspiration from Alexander Hamilton and implemented vertical integration into his business model. He began to operate a quarry, brickyards, and machine shops. He would also hire his own architects, shipping personnel, and other tradesmen to help see his projects to completion. By 1836, Rathbun's projects under construction had a collective value of $5.5 million ($157 million in 2024). His reputation led to him opening his own bank, with banknotes displaying his signature as "B. Rathbun". Rathbun's plans for more projects, including a Buffalo Exchange building, were halted prior to the Panic of 1837—he was later jailed for forged endorsements in 1836. This crisis led to mass unemployment in the lodging, education and banking sectors, which relied on his company's fortunes to succeed. Rathbun died on July 20, 1873.

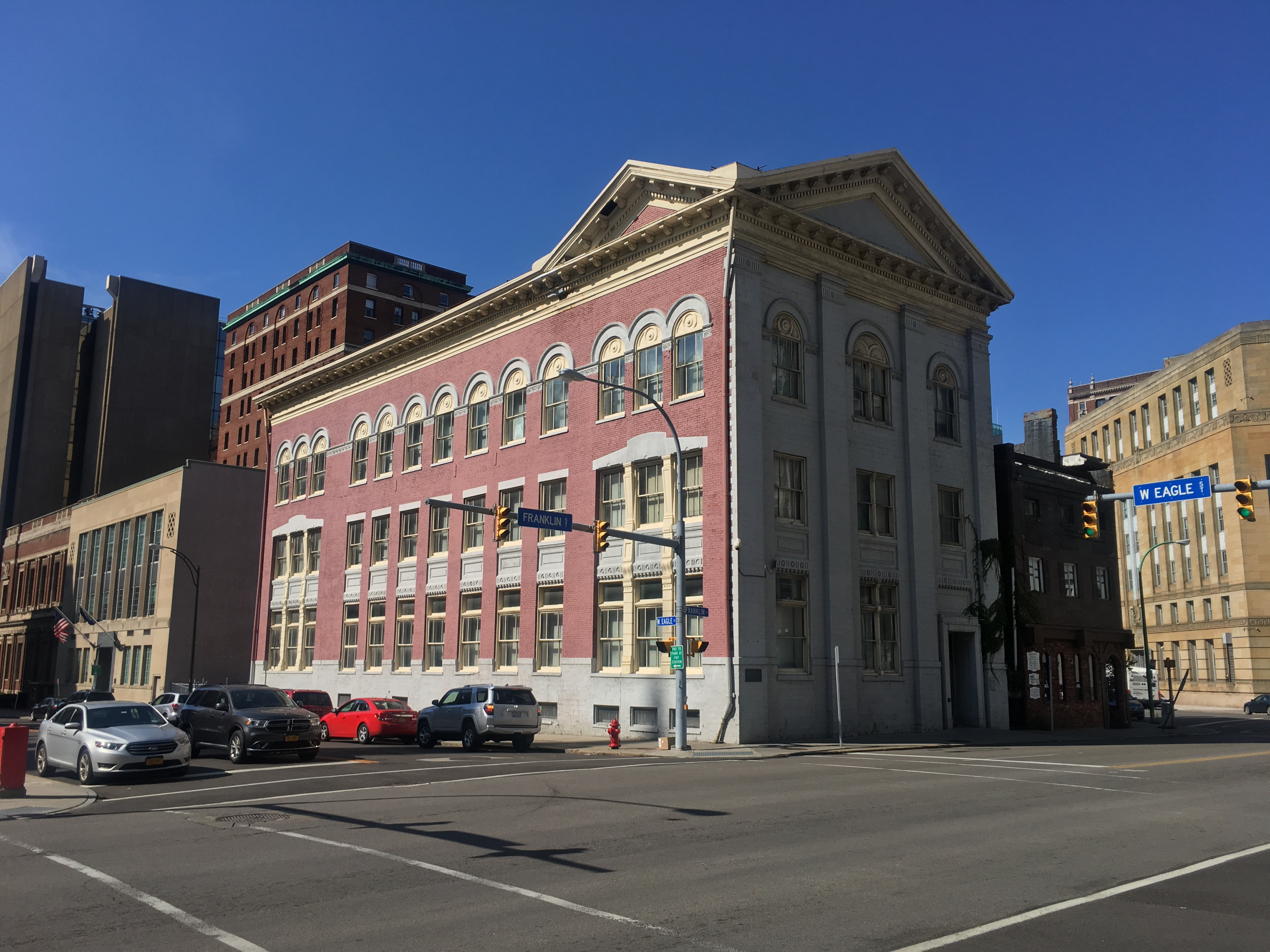
The Title Guarantee Building/former First Unitarian Church, the only remaining Rathbun building, as seen in 2019

The vast majority of Rathbun's buildings have been destroyed or demolished in the years since his period of activity. The sole exception is the Title Guarantee Building at the corner of Franklin and West Eagle Streets, which he built in 1833 as home of the First Unitarian Church, but was heavily altered by architect Franklin W. Caulkins upon its conversion to offices in the 1880s.
