= Frank X. Schwab =

American politician (1874–1946)

- Schwab in the 1924 Buffalo Police report

48th Mayor of Buffalo
- In office 1922–1929
- Preceded by: George S. Buck
- Succeeded by: Charles E. Roesch

Personal details
- Born: August 14, 1874 Buffalo, New York
- Died: April 23, 1946 (aged 71) Buffalo, New York
- Party: Republican
- Spouse: Theresa M. Lauser
- Children: 7

Francis Xavier Schwab (August 14, 1874 – April 23, 1946) was the mayor of Buffalo, New York, from 1922 until 1929. He was born on Smith Street on the Buffalo's East Side on August 14, 1874. At 19, he became a foreman at the Pullman Palace Car Company, then known as the Wagner Palace Car Company, and took a job as a traveling salesman for the company. He then became a brewery solicitor, eventually becoming the highest paid brewery solicitor in Buffalo. He married Theresa M. Lauser on September 24, 1901. He opened a wholesale and retail liquor store at Broadway and Jefferson Avenue in 1912. He became president and general manager of the Mohawk Products Company; the merged Buffalo Brewing Company and the Cooperative Brewing Company formed during Prohibition to make near-beer.

Schwab's rise in the Buffalo brewing industry was short-lived because of the enactment of prohibition in 1919. Even though Schwab transitioned into the production of near beer he would take the opportunity to speak out against the Volstead Act whenever possible. "By this time, Frank Schwab had developed a personal style that delighted his friends and infuriated his enemies". The Buffalo Brewing company, Schwab's brewery, was raided by Federal agents who found illegal beer resulting in an indictment for Schwab. Schwab was an unlikely candidate for mayor. He had no political experience, he was Catholic, and under federal indictment for illegal possession of alcohol. But in 1921, as a joke the Knights of St. John circulated a petition on behalf of Schwab for his mayoral candidacy.

He was elected mayor on November 8, 1921, as the Republican candidate. During his term, in the summer of 1922, the last and most bitter street railway strike occurred; Schwab declared a transportation emergency and authorized the running of buses. Finally, the International Railway Company went open shop and the union was broken. In 1923–1924, the city purchased land for an airfield and, on September 27, 1926, Mayor Schwab laid the cornerstone of the administration building for the Buffalo Airport. Schwab was easily re-elected to a second term on November 3, 1925. He lost his bid for re-election on November 5, 1929, with Charles Roesch elected mayor. Schwab returned to active management of Mohawk Products Company. He died on April 23, 1946, and was buried in Mt. Calvary Cemetery.

Political offices
Preceded by George S. Buck	Mayor of Buffalo, NY; 1922–1929	Succeeded by Charles E. Roesch
