= Louis P. Fuhrmann =

American politician

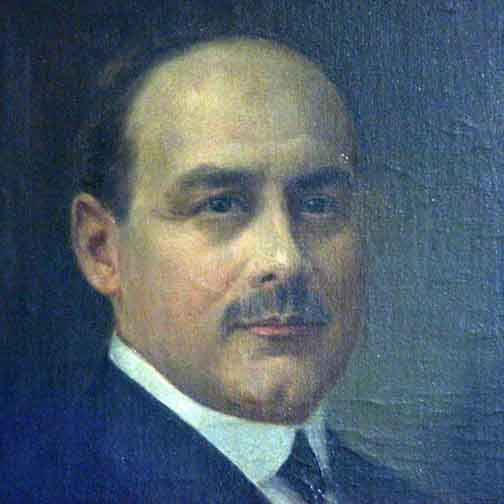
- Portrait of Louis P. Fuhrmann

46th Mayor of Buffalo
- In office 1910–1917
- Preceded by: James N. Adam
- Succeeded by: George S. Buck

Personal details
- Born: November 7, 1868 Buffalo, New York
- Died: February 23, 1931 (aged 62) Buffalo, New York
- Party: Democratic
- Spouse: Alice S. Meald
- Children: three children

Louis P. Fuhrmann (1868–1931) was Mayor of Buffalo, New York, from 1910 to 1917. Born in Buffalo on November 7, 1868, he grew up on the city's east side, graduated from Central High School, and began working in the meat packing industry. In 1892, he started his own meat-packing business at 1010 Clinton Street. He married Alice S. Meald on July 13, 1900.

In 1905, Fuhrmann was first elected a member of the Board of Aldermen from the Fifth Ward. He was elected on November 2, 1909, as the Democratic candidate. Fuhrmann narrowly defeated Councilman Jacob Siegrist 35,384 to 34,145. The race was so narrow that the 6 P.M. edition of the Buffalo Evening News called the race for Siegrist, before correcting it in the "EXTRA" edition.

In 1913, Fuhrmann was narrowly renominated as the Democratic candidate. Mayor Fuhrmann lost the endorsement of the Democratic Party, who selected Black Rock maltster George J. Meyer. Mayor Fuhrmann went on to defeat him in the September 16th primary.

He was elected to a second term on November 4, 1913. He defeated Progressive and Citizens candidate John Lord O'Brian and Republican Thomas Stoddart. Fuhrmann prevailed with 30,219 votes to O'Brian's 23,757 and Stoddart's 13,447. During this term, America entered World War I and the Mayor was integral in assisting the Federal Government in coordination of the American forces. He was defeated in his quest for a third term on November 6, 1917, and returned to his meat packing business.

In 1917, he was elected president of the Buffalo Baseball and Amusement Company and, in 1922, appointed a member of the Buffalo Board of Education. He died on February 23, 1931, and was buried in Forest Lawn Cemetery.

Political offices
Preceded by James N. Adam	Mayor of Buffalo, NY; 1910–1917	Succeeded by George S. Buck
