= West Village Historic District (Buffalo, New York) =

Historic district in New York, United States

- U.S. National Register of Historic Places
- U.S. Historic district
- New York State Register of Historic Places
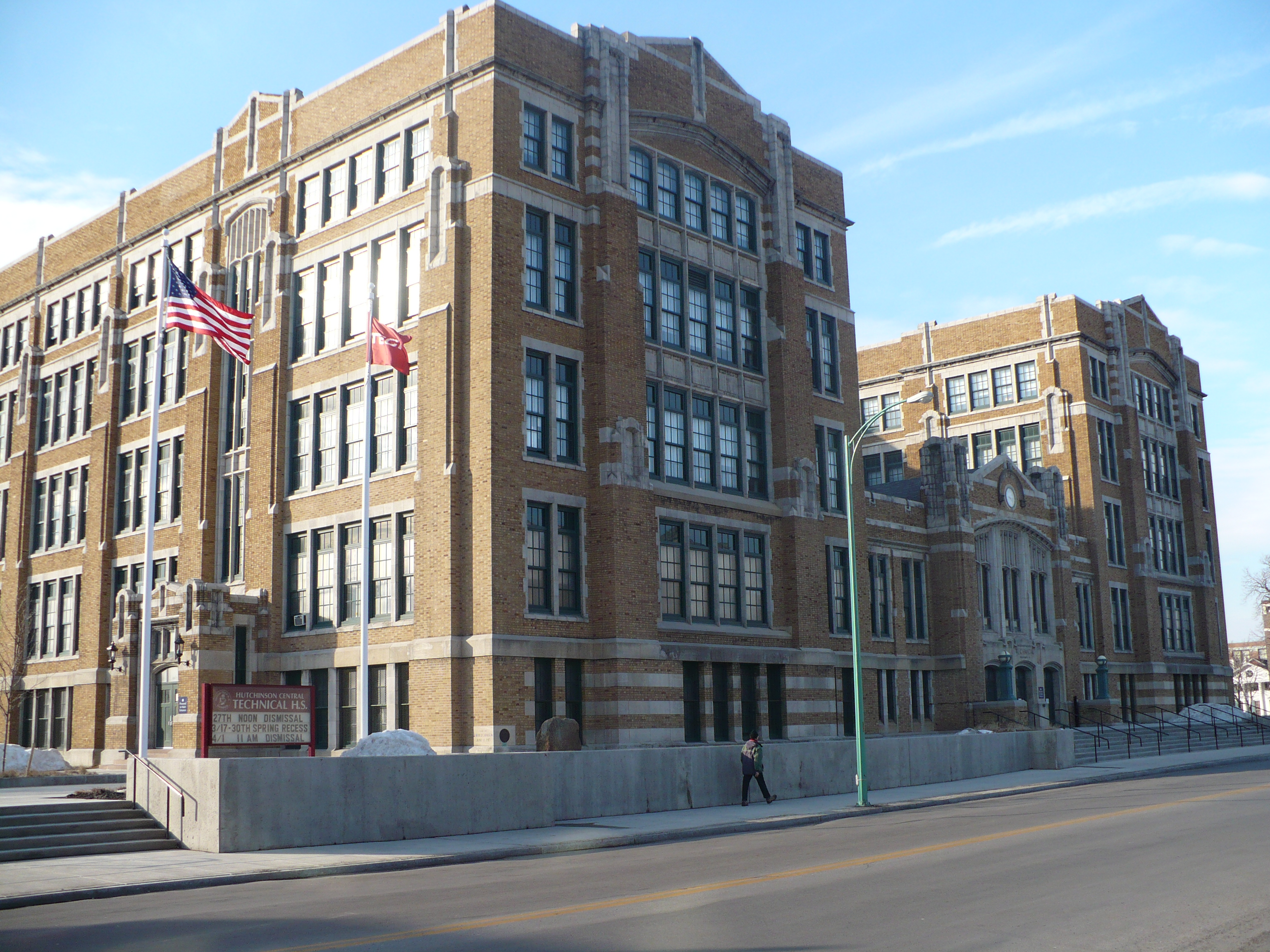
- The newly renovated Hutch-Tech High School, March 2008

- Location within New York Location within the United States
- Location: Roughly bounded by South Elmwood Ave., West Huron, Niagara, Carolina and Tracy Sts., Buffalo, New York
- Coordinates: 42°53′31″N 78°52′50″W
- Architects: Olmsted, Frederick Law
- Architectural style: Second Empire, Gothic, Italianate
- NRHP reference No.: 80002610

Significant dates
- Added to NRHP: May 06, 1980
- Designated NYSRHP: June 23, 1980

West Village Historic District is a national historic district located at Buffalo in Erie County, New York. The district is a 19th-century residential neighborhood within walking distance of the central business district and Lake Erie. It is one of Buffalo's oldest and most intact residential areas, having been developed on the site of the estate of the city's first mayor Ebenezer Johnson and South Village of Black Rock. It contains 102 structures built between 1854 and 1914, most of which are detached single-family dwellings, with about a dozen apartment buildings. The district reflects architectural styles of the late 19th century including the Second Empire, Gothic Revival, and Italianate style. Included in the district is Johnson Park, redesigned by Frederick Law Olmsted about 1876, and Hutchinson Central Technical High School.

It was listed on the National Register of Historic Places in 1980.

The West Village Historic District is also a Certified Local Historic District, with slightly different boundaries than the National Register listed district. The local district was designated in 1979 and then was certified by the National Park Service in 1983.
