= Forged endorsement =

A forged endorsement is an endorsement on a cheque or other negotiable instrument that was not signed by the person whose signature it appears to be. Under the United Kingdom's Bills of Exchange Act 1882, a forged signature on a bill is "wholly inoperative", and no right to keep the bill, give a discharge for it, or enforce payment of it can be acquired through that signature.

== Legal description ==
If an instrument is endorsed in full, it cannot be endorsed or negotiated except by an endorsement signed by the person to whom or to whose order the instrument is payable. Thus, if such an instrument is negotiated by way of a forged endorsement, the endorsee will not acquire the title even though he be a purchaser for value and in good faith, because the endorsement is nullity. But where the instrument has been endorsed in blank, it can be negotiated by mere delivery and the holder derives his title independent of the forged endorsement and can claim the amount from any of the parties to the instrument. In most of the United States, Articles 3 and 4 of the Uniform Commercial Code govern the rules of "who is liable to whom."

== Examples ==
A bill is endorsed, “payable to X or order”. X endorses it in blank and it comes into the hands of Y, who simply delivers it to A. A would then forge Y's endorsement and transfers it to B. B, as the holder, does not derive his title through the forged endorsement to Y, but through the genuine endorsement of X and can claim payment from any of the parties to the instrument in spite of the intervening forged endorsement.
