= The Sound of Feeling =

Studio album by Oliver Nelson
- Released: November 1968
- Recorded: November 3 & 4, 1966 and November 11, 1967
- Studio: Van Gelder Studio, Englewood Cliffs, NJ and Los Angeles, CA
- Genre: Jazz
- Length: 35:23
- Label: Verve; V/V6 8743
- Producer: Creed Taylor and Jesse Kaye

Oliver Nelson chronology
Encyclopedia of Jazz (1966)	The Sound of Feeling (1968)	The Spirit of '67 (1967)

The Sound of Feeling (full title Leonard Feather Presents The Sound of Feeling and The Sound of Oliver Nelson) is a jazz album featuring two separate groups featuring Oliver Nelson recorded in late 1966 and released on the Verve label. The split album begins with five tracks by the Los Angeles based group The Sound of Feeling, featuring identical twin vocalists Alyce and Rhae Andrece and pianist Gary David with the addition of soloist Nelson. Four tracks are by the Encyclopedia of Jazz All Stars, a big band drawn from the ranks of top New York studio musicians, arranged and conducted by Nelson which were recorded to accompany Leonard Feather's Encyclopedia of Jazz in the Sixties.

== Reception ==
Professional ratings
Review scores
Source	Rating
Down Beat	4.5/5 stars
Allmusic	2/5 stars

In the November 28, 1968 issue, the long-lived and much respected jazz publication Down Beat magazine awarded the album four and a half stars.

The Allmusic site awarded the album 2 stars.

== Track listing ==
1. "My Favorite Things" (Richard Rodgers, Oscar Hammerstein II) – 3:24
2. "Waltz Without Words" (Gary David) – 4:09
3. "Who Knows What Love Is?" (David) – 4:25
4. "Phrases" (Alyce Andrece, Rhae Andrece) – 3:40
5. "Circe Revisited" (David, Bob Fylling) – 5:56
6. "Ricardo's Dilemma" (Roy Ayers) – 2:33
7. "Twelve Tone Blues" (mistitled as "Patterns for Orchestra") (Oliver Nelson) – 3:07
8. "The Sidewalks of New York" (Charles B. Lawlor, James W. Blake) – 6:27
9. "Greensleeves" (Traditional) – 2:26
- Recorded at Van Gelder Studio in Englewood Cliffs, NJ on November 3, 1966 (track 6) and November 4 (tracks 7–9), 1966 and in Los Angeles, CA on December 11, 1967 (tracks 1–5).

== Personnel ==
=== The Sound of Feeling (tracks 1–5) ===
- Oliver Nelson – soprano saxophone
- Alyce Andrece, Rhae Andrece – vocals
- Gary David – composer, arranger, vocals, piano (1–5), marxophone (5)
- Chuck Domanico, Ray Neapolitan – bass
- Dick Wilson – drums

=== The Oliver Nelson Orchestra (tracks 6–9) ===
- Oliver Nelson – arranger, conductor
- Burt Collins (6), Joe Newman, Ernie Royal, Clark Terry, Joe Wilder, Snooky Young (6–9), Nat Adderley (7–9) – trumpet, flugelhorn
- Nat Adderley – cornet (7–9)
- Jimmy Cleveland, J. J. Johnson – additional trombones
- Bob Brookmeyer – valve trombone
- Tony Studd – bass trombone
- Jerry Dodgion, Jerome Richardson – flutes
- Jerome Richardson – soprano saxophone
- Jerry Dodgion, Phil Woods – clarinets, alto saxophones
- Jerome Richardson, Zoot Sims – tenor saxophones
- Danny Bank – baritone saxophone
- Al Dailey (6), Hank Jones (7–9) – piano
- Eric Gale – guitar
- Ron Carter – bass
- Grady Tate – drums
- Phil Kraus (6), Bobby Rosengarden (7–9) – mallets, additional percussion
