= Al Smith presidential campaign =

Al Smith ran for President of the United States multiple times, unsuccessfully.

- Al Smith 1920 presidential campaign; see 1920 Democratic National Convention
- Al Smith 1924 presidential campaign
- Al Smith 1928 presidential campaign
- Al Smith 1932 presidential campaign
