= Sidewalks of New York (1923 film) =

1923 film directed by Lester Park

- Directed by: Lester Park
- Written by: Willard King Bradley
- Based on: "The Sidewalks of New York"; 1894 song by James W. Blake; Charles B. Lawlor
- Starring: Hanna Lee; Bernard Siegel; Templar Saxe
- Production company: Lester Park Productions
- Distributed by: States' rights
- Release date: August 6, 1923 (US)
- Running time: 6 reels
- Country: United States
- Language: English

Sidewalks of New York is a 1923 American silent melodrama film directed by Lester Park and written by Willard King Bradley, based on the song by James W. Blake and Charles B. Lawlor. The film stars Hanna Lee, Bernard Siegel, and Templar Saxe.

== Cast list ==
- Hanna Lee
- Bernard Siegel
- Templar Saxe
