= Trip the light fantastic =

English-language idiom

To "trip the light fantastic" is to dance nimbly or lightly to music. The origin of the phrase is attributed to the English poet John Milton.

== History ==
This phrase evolved over time. Its origin is attributed to Milton's 1645 poem L'Allegro, which includes lines addressed to Euphrosyne—one of the Three Graces of Greek mythology:

Com, and trip it as ye go
On the light fantastick toe,

In Milton's use the word "trip" means to "dance nimbly" and "fantastic" suggests "extremely fancy". "Light fantastic" refers to the word toe, and "toe" refers to a dancer's "footwork". "Toe" has since disappeared from the idiom, which then becomes: "trip the light fantastic". A few years before, in 1637, Milton had used the expression "light fantastic" in reference to dancing in his masque Comus: "Come, knit hands, and beat the ground,/In a light fantastic round."

Prior to Milton, the expression "tripping on his toe" appears in Shakespeare's The Tempest (1610–1611):

Before you can say come, and goe,
And breathe twice; and cry, so, so:
Each one tripping on his Toe,
Will be here with mop, and mowe.

The phrase "He did trip it / On the toe" appears in the Jacobean song "Since Robin Hood", set to music by Thomas Weelkes in 1608.

This expression was popularized in the American song "The Sidewalks of New York" (melody and lyrics by Charles B. Lawlor and James W. Blake) in 1894. Part of the chorus:

Boys and girls together, me and Mamie O'Rourke
Tripped the light fantastic
On the sidewalks of New York.

The phrase occurs in Nella Larsen's 1929 novel, Passing, when the character Hugh Wentworth, while watching black and white men and women dancing together, chats with Irene and says, "Not having tripped the light fantastic with any males, I'm not in a position to argue the point."

=== Milton, Blake and Michelangelo ===
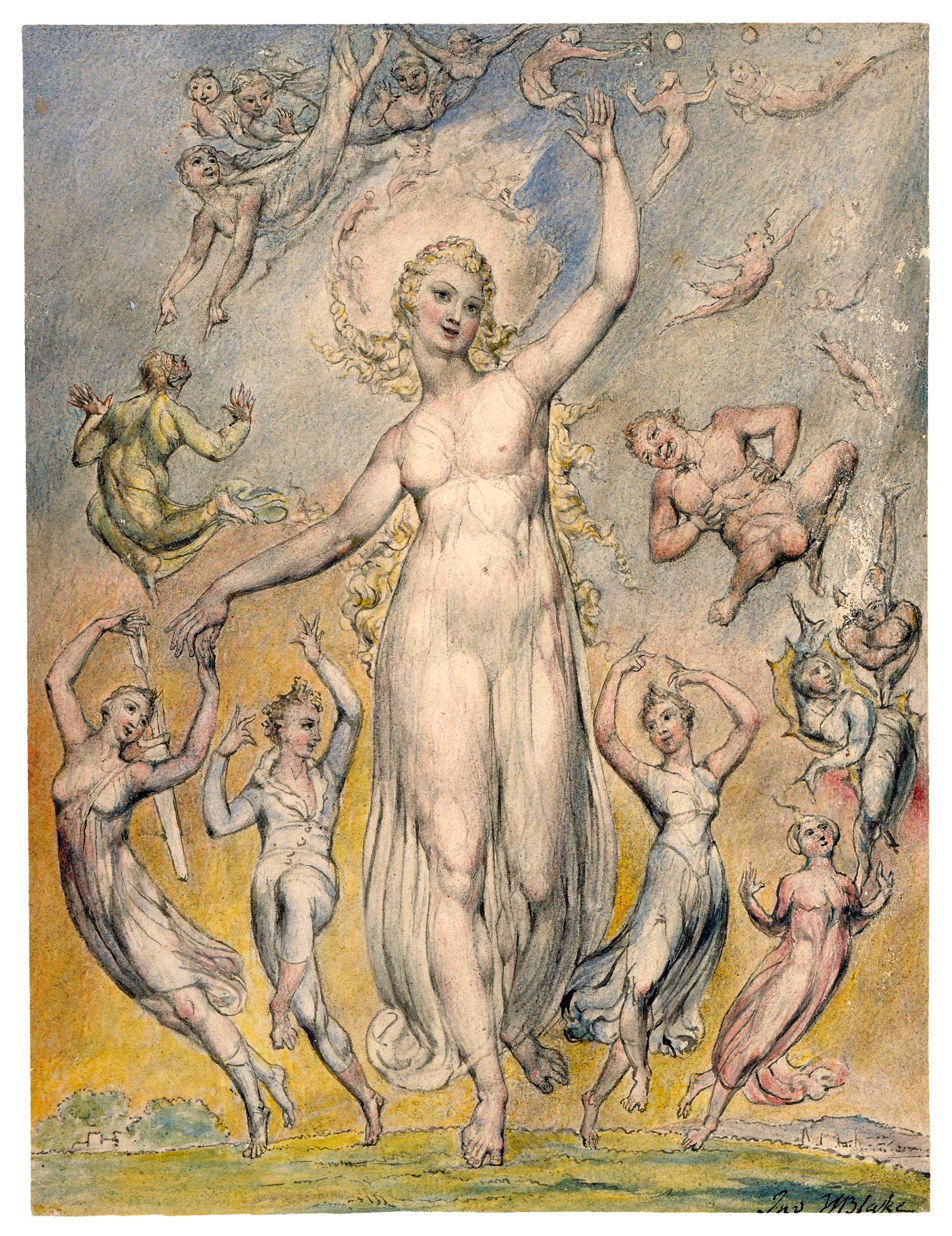
Mirth by William Blake

John Milton's poem L'Allegro (1631) encourages the goddess Mirth/Euphrosyne to "trip it as ye go/On the light fantastick toe", and that poem inspired William Blake to create a watercolor, "Mirth" (1820), which illustrates that moment in Milton's poem. It is thought that Milton's poem may have been inspired by Michelangelo's sculpture of Giuliano de' Medici, which represents vita activa (active life).

== Syntactical critique ==
In a discussion of anomalous idiomacies in a paradigm attributed to Noam Chomsky in his book Syntactic Structures, it is suggested that some idioms are not "syntactically well-formed which could not be generated by a base component designed to produce well-formed deep structures". The examples given are the idioms "by and large", "kingdom come", and "trip the light fantastic". The phrase, and other examples, are considered "opaque because it is impossible to construct a meaningful literal-scene from the formal structure. Nevertheless, these idioms can be recognised as complex constructions rather than as holophrastic sequences. One can therefore claim that for these expressions, the literal-scene only exists as a highly schematic mental representation: ... trip the light fantastic is a form of tripping." An idiom is considered opaque when the idiom's individual words do not reveal the meaning of the expression. For example the word "trip" has not retained its former meaning — to "dance nimbly".

== Variations and occurrences in popular culture ==
- A song titled "The Ballet Girl; or She danced on the light fantastic toe", contains the verse "While she danced on her light fantastic toe,/ Round the stage she used to go." It was sung by Tony Pastor at his Bowery opera house, and was then published in 1867.
- In the opening monologue of Tennessee Williams' 1944 play, The Glass Menagerie, the character Tom addresses the audience, indicates a photograph, and says:

This is our father who left us a long time ago. He was a telephone man who fell in love with long distances; he gave up his job with the telephone company and skipped the light fantastic out of town . . .

- Chester Himes in 1960 used a variation on the phrase: "Colored boys and girls in ski ensembles and ballet skirts were skating the light fantastic at two o'clock ... "
- In 1967, the English rock band Procol Harum released its song, "A Whiter Shade of Pale" with lyrics by Keith Reid, which includes the phrase

we skipped the light fandango,
turned cartwheels 'cross the floor.
I was feeling kinda seasick,
but the crowd called out for more…

- In 1973, Stephen Sondheim employed two variations of the phrase ("trip the light fandango" and "pitch the quick fantastic") in the song "The Miller's Son", from his musical A Little Night Music.
- In 1978, the Australian New Wave project Flash and the Pan released "Walking in the Rain", which later became a minor hit in the cover version by Grace Jones and included the phrase:

Trip the light fantastic
Dance the swivel hips
Coming to conclusion
Button up your lips.

- Trip the Light Fantastic is the name of an afternoon show on the Australian radio station 2EARfm.
- In 1985, rock band Marillion released its song "Heart of Lothian" which included the line "and the trippers of the light fantastic, bow down, hoe-down." In 1997, American Rock Band Lit named their first studio album “Tripping the Light Fantastic”. American rock band Greta Van Fleet recorded a song titled "Trip the Light Fantastic" for their 2021 album The Battle at Garden's Gate.
