= Prudence Building =

Former building in Manhattan, New York

Coordinates: 40°45.2′0″N 73°58.72′0″W

- Interactive map of the Prudence Building area

General information
- Status: Demolished
- Architectural style: Romanian Revival architecture
- Location: Manhattan, New York City
- Opened: 1923
- Demolished: 2016

The Prudence Building, or Prudence Bonds Building, was a fourteen-story edifice at the southeast corner of Madison Avenue and 43rd Street, in Midtown Manhattan, New York City. It was the headquarters of the Prudence Bonds Corporation, opening in October 1923. Stores on the street level were leased to affluent shops. The banking floor was a close likeness of the Bankers Trust Company building at the southeast corner of Fifth Avenue and 42nd Street. The Bank of Manhattan was accorded a 21-year lease and moved its headquarters from 40 Wall Street. The building was demolished in 2016 and the site is now the location of One Vanderbilt.

== Design ==
The structure was built on a plot 66.8 by 100 feet (30 m). The building was entered from Madison Avenue via antique bronze doors. The entrance floor opened into a sixteen-foot-wide marble corridor with elevators leading to the upper floors. An imposing stairway of Italian Travertine marble, ten feet wide with ample landings, led directly to the banking floor. This area was eleven feet above street level. It was composed of marble with a twenty-foot ceiling of Roman architecture classic design. An artistic screen of marble and statuary bronze surrounded the banking space.

The former Charles building was incorporated into the Prudence Building, which encompassed the area once occupied by several structures. The Charles building space became the loan department of the new edifice, a quiet section constructed of steel.

== Political importance ==
The headquarters of the New York State Committee for the presidential campaign of Al Smith opened in the Prudence Building on May 5, 1924. The committee's chairman was Franklin Delano Roosevelt. After retiring from politics in 1929, Smith made his permanent home an apartment at the southeast corner of 12th Street and Fifth Avenue. His office was in the Prudence Building. It was the administrative center of Tammany Hall in 1950, having relocated from their former headquarters at East 17th Street and 4th Avenue in 1943. Specifically its offices were on the 5th floor of the Prudence Building.

== Business locale ==
C. Klauberg & Bros., Inc., a razor and cutlery firm established in the early 19th century moved its quarters from the Prudence Building to the Biltmore Hotel at Madison Avenue and 43rd Street, January 1936. By making the change in location, the company increased its space by three times. Hoffritz, Inc., a cutlery interest with a store in the McAlpin Hotel, leased a unit in the Prudence Building in May 1936. Wheelock, Harris & Company negotiated the rental.
