= Michael F. Blake =

American politician

Municipal Court Judge (New York City)
- In office January 1, 1908 – 1928

Personal details
- Born: Michael F. Blake; August 1, 1858 New York, New York
- Died: July 31, 1929 Brooklyn, New York
- Party: Democratic
- Spouse: Mary W. Blake
- Children: Joseph A. Blake, Francis L. Blake, Roswell P. Blake Walter J. Blake, Laura Brown, and Mary Blake
- Parents: Michael Blake (father); Elizabeth Blake (mother)
- Relatives: James W. Blake (brother), John Blake (brother), Mary Blake (sister), three other siblings
- Education: Columbia Law School

Michael F. Blake (August 1, 1857 – July 31, 1929) was the chief clerk of the New York City Board of Aldermen from 1892 to 1907 and a Municipal Court Justice in New York City from 1908 to 1928.

== Early life ==
Blake was one of seven children born to Michael and Elizabeth Blake, who were both from County Westmeath in Ireland. He was born in his family's home at 312 East 18th Street, just off Second Avenue in New York City.

Blake was a schoolmate of Charles F. Murphy and James A. Foley, who both later became prominent in Tammany Hall, the dominant force and political club in New York City politics for many decades.

== Prior to politics ==
As a young man, Blake headed west and was a news reporter before acquiring control of the Seattle Star. After several years he sold his stake in that newspaper and returned to New York City, where he wrote political articles for the New York Herald and became the city reporter for The New York Sun.

== Political career ==
Blake remained in touch with Murphy, who rose to prominence in Tammany Hall, and became a district captain and then a district leader for Tammany. He then went to Columbia Law School, and graduated in 1886. After graduating, he studied law under Justice Abraham B. Tappen of New York Supreme Court. In 1889 Blake was appointed deputy clerk for the New York City Common Council, also known as the Board of Aldermen. In 1892 he became the chief clerk with a salary of $5,000, and afterward was re-elected by the aldermen annually. In 1893, Blake became member of the Tammany Society.

He resigned his chief clerk position in 1907 to run for election as a City Court judge, a post which he won and held for 20 years before retiring in 1928.

== Death ==
Blake died on July 31, 1929. He was survived by his wife Mary W. Blake; sons Joseph A. Blake, Francis L. Blake, Roswell P. Blake and Walter J. Blake; and daughters Laura Brown and Mary Blake. He was also survived by siblings, including James W. Blake, a part-time lyricist who was famous for the words to the 1894 song, The Sidewalks of New York.
