= Wonderland Village =

Shopping center in Livonia, Michigan

Coordinates: 42°22′6.9″N 83°20′1.7″W

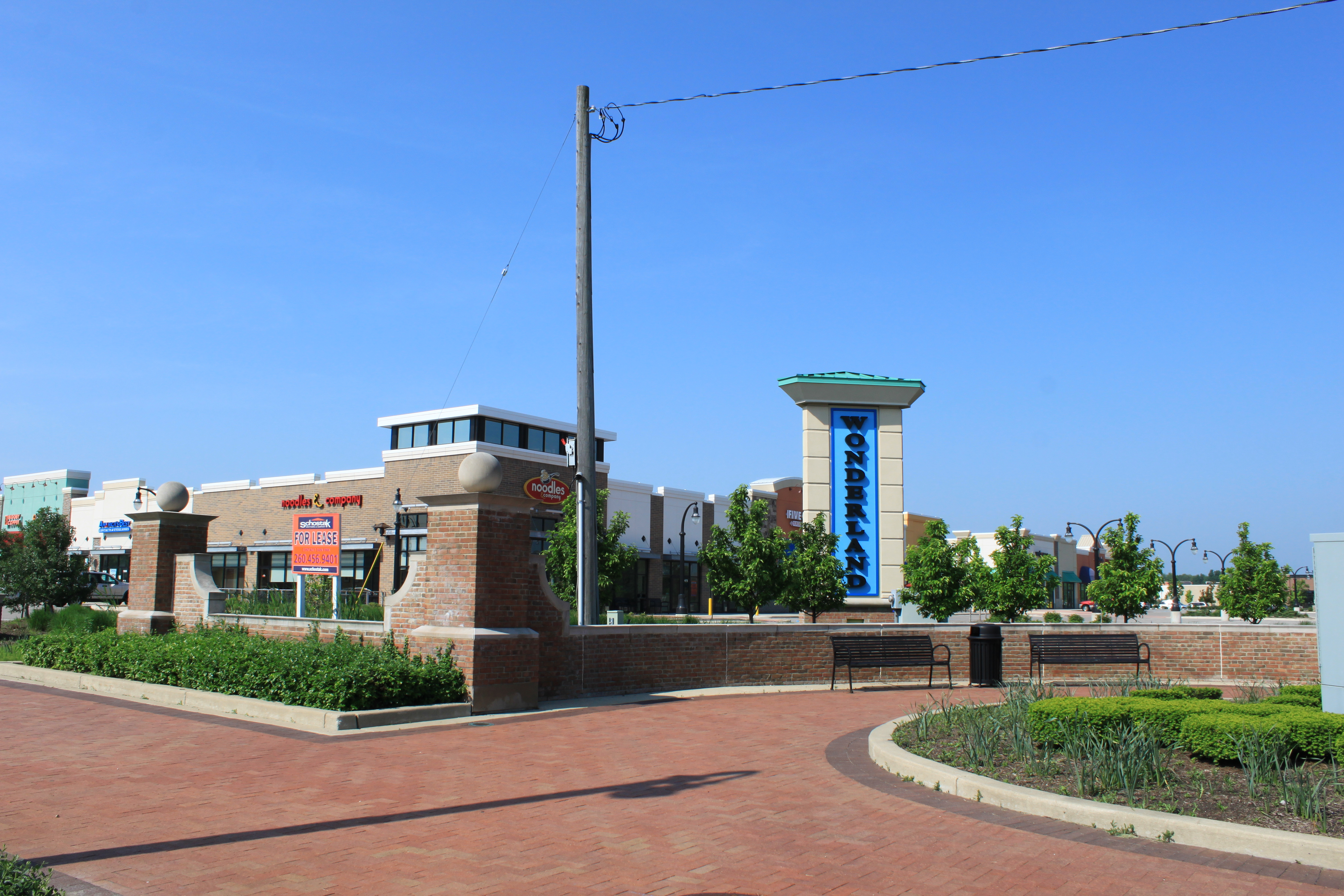
- Location: Livonia, Michigan, United States
- Opened: 1959 (as Wonderland Center); 2007 (as Wonderland Village)
- Developer: Schostak Corporation
- Manager: Schostak Corporation
- Owner: Schostak Corporation
- Num. of stores: 40 +
- Num. of anchor tenants: 2
- Floors: 1
- Public transit: DDOT: 38

Wonderland Village is an outdoor shopping center in Livonia, Michigan, United States, a suburb of Detroit. The center is located at the southwest corner of Middlebelt Road and Plymouth Road, approximately one mile south of I-96. Opened in 1959 as the outdoor Wonderland Center, it originally featured Montgomery Ward and Federal's as its major anchor stores. A 1980s renovation enclosed the formerly open-air complex and renamed it Wonderland Mall, by which point the anchor stores were Montgomery Ward, Service Merchandise, and Target. This configuration lasted throughout the late 1990s, by which point the closure of both Service Merchandise and Montgomery Ward had led to a number of vacancies. The center reopened officially in 2007.

== History ==
Schostak Brothers, a real estate company based out of Livonia, Michigan, announced plans to build Wonderland Center in that city in 1958. The company chose to construct a 60-store outdoor mall at the southwest corner of Plymouth and Middlebelt roads. Serving as the anchor stores would be a 215,000-square-foot (20,000 m^{2}) Montgomery Ward and an 80,000-square-foot (7,400 m^{2}) Federal's; other major tenants would include Food Fair and Wrigley supermarkets, along with S. S. Kresge and Woolworth department stores. Many Detroit-based chains would have locations at the mall, including Winkleman's clothing store and Sanders Confectionery, as well as the national shoe store chains Edison Brothers and Thom McAn. A 1958 article in the Detroit Free Press described it as the "largest regional shopping center in western Wayne County". At the time of opening in September 1959, the Montgomery Ward store at Wonderland Center was the largest in the chain. One month later, Federal's opened for business as well. The store was the 31st in that chain.

In 1983, Schostak converted Wonderland from an open-air complex to an enclosed shopping mall. As part of the renovation was a 22-restaurant food court called Eaton Place, in the former location of the Federal's department store which closed in 1980. The new Wonderland Mall was dedicated in November 1986. This renovation added 100,000 square feet (9,300 m^{2}) of gross leasable area. Further renovation in 1989 added a Target store and a movie theater operated by AMC Theatres, followed by Service Merchandise, OfficeMax and Dunham's Sports in the early 1990s. After these latter expansions, Wonderland Mall was 862,000 square feet (80,100 m^{2}) in size and comprised more than 80 tenants.

Schostak continued to renovate Wonderland Mall extensively throughout the 1990s. By the end of the decade, the company relocated some stores from a wing to add entertainment-oriented tenants such as an f.y.e. music store and an indoor amusement park called Jeepers! The mall's food court was also redesigned and increased in size by 40%, adding national chain restaurants such as Burger King, Sbarro and Steak Escape. The mall also introduced Cyberspace Safari, a marketing program that allowed patrons of the mall to surf the Web and learn about the Internet. The addition of these entertainment venues soon boosted mall sales 20%.

Despite the increase in sales brought on by the addition of entertainment venues, the mall gained a reputation for crime, which combined with the demise of two anchor stores, led to the mall's downfall. Service Merchandise closed in 1999 with the chain. In 2000, Montgomery Ward closed the last of its stores nationwide; many of the other inline tenants began to close as well. Mazel's, a closeout store, opened at the mall in 2000.

== Redevelopment ==
Wonderland Mall was officially shuttered in 2003, except for Target, Office Max, and Dunham's Sports, the latter two of which closed in 2004. After the mall was closed, plans were announced to demolish the entire structure and an adjacent former Kmart store (which also closed in 2003), and build a new shopping center anchored by a new Target store, as well as a Walmart.

Opponents of the mall's redevelopment held a civic meeting in late 2005, which was interrupted by pranksters shouting epithets, and other opponents picketed in front of the vacant mall. Despite the local opposition, plans were approved for the new shopping center and demolition began in 2006.

== Description ==
The demolition of the old Wonderland Mall made way for construction of the new Wonderland Village shopping center, on which construction began in late 2006. Target opened its new store on July 25, 2007, followed by Walmart a month later. Other tenants which have since opened include Noodles & Company, Qdoba, Verizon, FedEx Kinkos, Dot's, Five Guys, Chili's, and Casual Male XL.
