= Joseph M. Proskauer =

American judge (1877–1971)

Joseph Proskauer
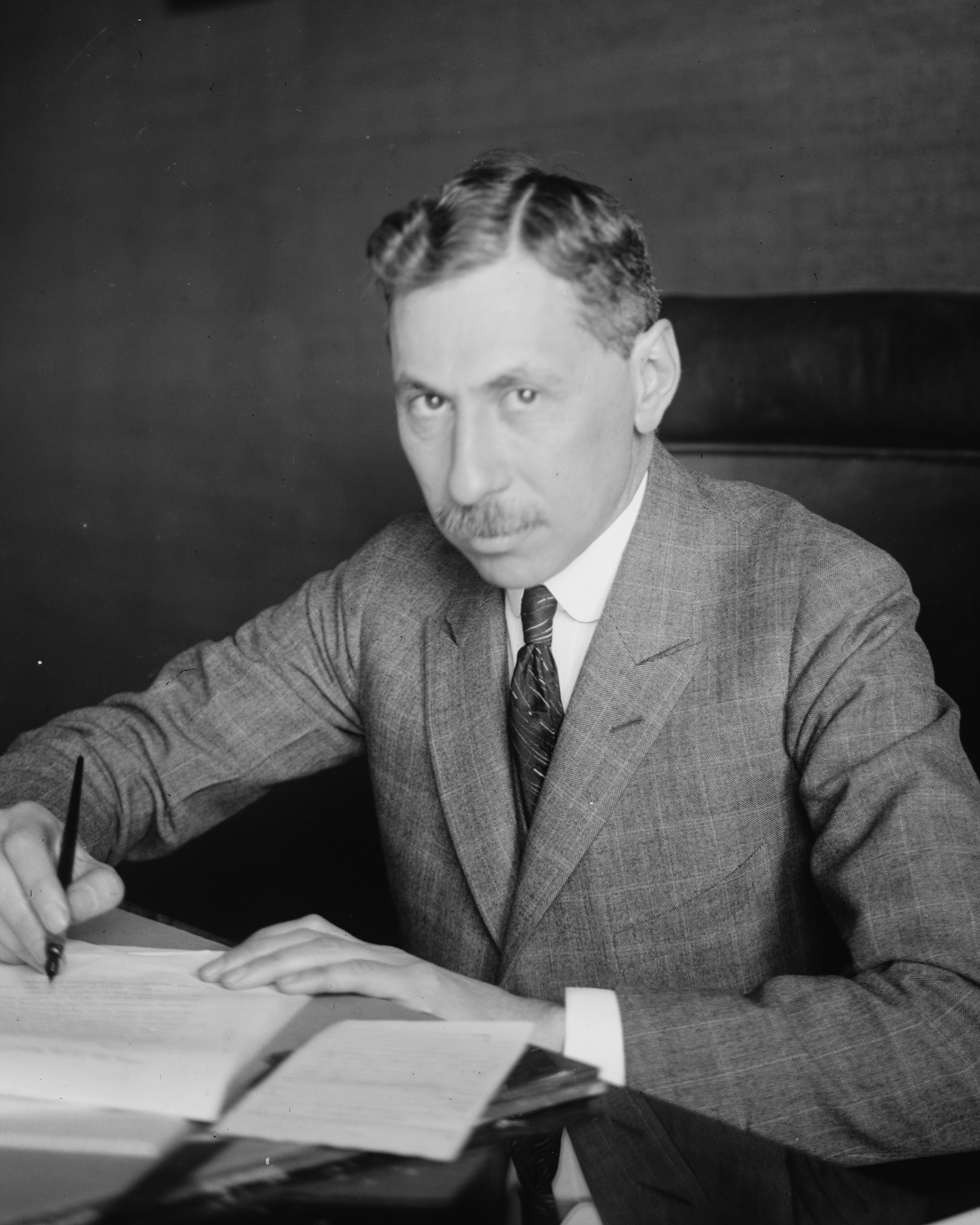
- Proskauer c. 1915—20

Personal details
- Born: Joseph Meyer Proskauer; August 6, 1877 Mobile, Alabama, U.S.
- Died: September 10, 1971 (aged 94) New York City, New York, U.S.
- Spouse: Alice Naumburg (m. 1903)
- Children: 3, including Ruth
- Education: Columbia University (BA, LLB)

Joseph Meyer Proskauer (6 August 1877 – 10 September 1971) was an American lawyer, judge, philanthropist, and political activist and is the name partner of Proskauer Rose.

== Biography ==
Proskauer was born in Mobile, Alabama, to a Jewish family in 1877. His parents were Alfred and Rebecca Proskauer. At 15, he came to New York City to attend Columbia University. He earned an A.B. from Columbia Law School in 1896 and an LL.B in 1899. He was admitted to the bar that same year. He was later awarded honorary degrees from Hebrew Union College, Dartmouth College, Brandeis University, New York University, and Fordham University.

Proskauer married Alice Naumburg on October 14, 1903, and they had three children: Frances, Ruth, and Richard.

After being admitted to the bar, Proskauer and a friend formed a law firm, which in 1902 merged with James, Schell & Elkus to create a firm that later became Elkus, Gleason & Proskauer.

Early in his career, Proskauer became a friend of New York Governor Al Smith and served as his campaign advisor and speechwriter. In June 1923, Smith appointed him a judge on the New York Supreme Court to fill the unexpired term of another judge. In November 1923, he was elected to a full term. In 1927, he was appointed an appellate judge and served in that position until he retired from the bench in 1930. He then returned to private law practice and joined the firm of Rose & Paskus, which later became Proskauer Rose, and worked for it for 40 years until his retirement.

From 1951 to 1953, he chaired the New York State Crime Commission investigating organized crime in New York City, and he was involved in the creation of the Waterfront Commission.

Proskauer died in 1971 at the age of 94.

== Political activism ==
Proskauer was active in many civic and charity organizations. He chaired several Jewish cultural and charity groups, including the 92nd Street Y, and was President of the American Jewish Committee (AJC) from 1943 to 1949. He continued to serve as honorary president after his term had expired. In 1946, he testified before the Anglo-American Committee of Inquiry on behalf of the AJC.

== See also ==
- Al Smith presidential campaign, 1924
- Al Smith presidential campaign, 1928
- Al Smith presidential campaign, 1932
