= Ruth P. Smith =

American advocate for reproductive rights (1907–2010)

- Born: August 14, 1907; Deal, New Jersey, US
- Died: January 22, 2010 (aged 102); New York City, US
- Known for: Pro-choice activist
- Spouse: Theodore Smith (m. 1932; div. 1946)
- Parent(s): Joseph M. Proskauer and Alice Naumberg

Ruth Proskauer Smith (August 14, 1907 – January 22, 2010) was an American advocate for reproductive rights.

== Personal life ==
Smith was born Ruth Proskauer on August 14, 1907, in Deal, New Jersey, to Joseph M. Proskauer and Alice Naumburg and grew up in Manhattan. Her father served on the New York Supreme Court, was an adviser to New York Governor Alfred E. Smith, and a partner of the law firm Proskauer Rose. Her mother was one of the founders of the Euthanasia Society of America.

For her secondary education she attended Ethical Culture Fieldston School in New York City. In 1929, Radcliffe College awarded her a bachelor's degree. Two years later she received a Master of Fine Arts in medieval art, also from Radcliff.

On June 11, 1932, she married Theodore Smith. They had a son, Anthony, and a daughter, Gael. The marriage ended in divorce in 1946.

== Early career ==
In the 1940s, Smith worked for the Massachusetts chapter of Planned Parenthood. As an executive secretary of the organization, she unsuccessfully attempted to overturn the state's banning of birth control. In 1953, she moved to New York to work at Mount Sinai Hospital, where she managed the family planning service. Two years later, she became the executive director of the Human Betterment Association (later renamed Emergence of the World Population Control Movement), where she worked until 1964.

In 1959, Smith's mother died an agonizing death. Smith became shocked at this occurrence and became one of the foremost leaders of voluntary euthanasia. Even though she was almost ninety years old at the time, Smith donated and strategized for a campaign that culminated in the passing of Oregon's right-to-die law. Historian Ian Dowbiggin said that Smith "played a pivotal role in the struggle for birth control, for euthanasia, and for abortion." Along with eleven other people, she helped establish the National Association for the Repeal of Abortion Laws (now called NARAL Pro-Choice America) in the 1969.

In 1962, she moved into a two-bedroom apartment in The Dakota on 72nd Street and Central Park West on the Upper West Side of Manhattan and she continued to live in this fifth-floor home for the next 50 years.

== Later career ==
Until 2009, she held seminars four times a week for Quest, a program at the City College of New York for retirees at which she taught the history of the US Supreme Court.

She appeared on Ken Burns's documentary Prohibition, which was released in 2011, after her death. She described how she and her friends attempted to make alcohol at home during the Prohibition era and her visits to the 21 Club, in New York City, at the time.

== Death and burial ==
Smith died on January 22, 2010, in New York at her home in Manhattan's Upper West Side. Her son, Anthony, said that she "died where she wanted to, when she wanted to, and as she wanted to." At the time of her death, she had six grandchildren and seven great-grandchildren.

In 2016, The New York Times reported that her remains ended up in a mass grave in the potter's field on New York City's Hart Island, three years after her body was donated to New York University School of Medicine for scientific purposes.
