= The Sidewalks of New York =

Song

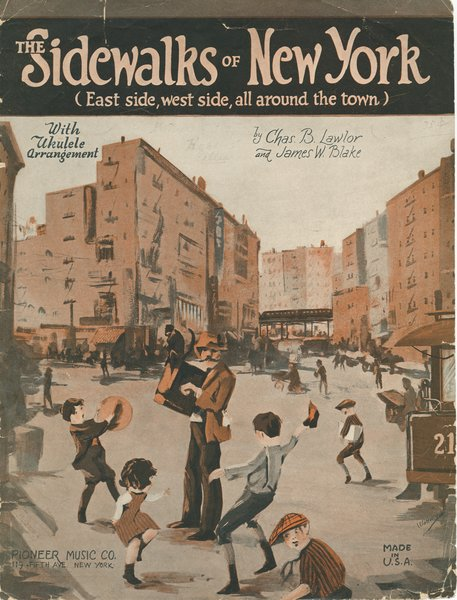
Sheet music cover from 1914

"The Sidewalks of New York" is a popular song about life in New York City during the 1890s. It was composed in 1894 by vaudeville actor and singer Charles B. Lawlor (June 2, 1852 – May 31, 1925) with lyrics by James W. Blake (September 23, 1862 – May 24, 1935). It was an immediate and long-lasting hit and is often considered a theme for New York City. Many artists, including Mel Tormé, Duke Ellington, Larry Groce, Richard Barone, and The Grateful Dead, have performed it. Governor Al Smith of New York used it as a theme song for his failed presidential campaigns of 1920, 1924, and 1928. The song is also known as "East Side, West Side" from the first words of the chorus.

== History ==
The tune, a slow and deliberate waltz, was devised by Lawlor. He had been singing at Charlie Murphy's Anawanda (Democratic) Club, for a Ladies' Night with a good party. On his walk home, he thought to himself that he sang everyone else's tunes, and he should write one of his own. He couldn't think of anything on his long walk home, but during the night the tune and theme came to him - from the walk itself. The next day, he went downtown to John Golden's hat store, where Blake worked, and hummed the melody for him. The melody was very similar to an 1892 song called "Daisy Bell (Bicycle Built for Two)" by British composer Harry Dacre. Blake took a liking to the 3/4 tune, and had Lawlor repeat it several times. "You get the music on paper," he told Lawlor, "and I'll write the words for it." Lawlor returned to the store in about twenty minutes with the musical notes written, and Blake was halfway through the lyrics, having been interrupted by a customer. He finished the words in another half-hour. The tune and words became familiar and well known throughout New York City. It was first made famous by Lottie Gilson, and it had staying power because the melody was catchy and easy to sing.

The words were a shared vision of Lawlor and Blake, and recall their childhood neighborhoods and those who grew up with them. It was a universal longing for youth, yesteryear, and place, although it was also idealized because both Lawlor and Blake had grown up quite poor. Lawlor said that he envisioned a "big husky policeman leaning against a lamppost and twirling his club, an organ grinder playing nearby, and the east side kids with dirty faces, shoes unlaced, stockings down, torn clothes, dancing to the music, while from a tenement window an old Irish woman with a checkered cap and one of those old time checkered shawls around her shoulders, looking down and smiling at the children." The words of the song tell the story of Blake's childhood, including the friends (all with Irish surnames) with whom he played as a child, namely Johnny Casey, Jimmy Crowe, Nellie Shannon (who danced the waltz), and Mamie O'Rourke (who taught Blake how to "trip the light fantastic" — an extravagant expression for dancing). The song is sung in nostalgic retrospect, as Blake and his childhood friends went their separate ways, some leading to success while others did not ("some are up in 'G' / others they are on the hog").

The song became popular right after it was published, and Governor Al Smith of New York was credited for its renaissance, having used it as a theme song during his presidential campaigns of 1924, 1928, and 1932. During Smith's 1928 campaign, the urban-centric tune proved symbolic of a campaign that failed to find its footing in America's more rural areas, where Herbert Hoover was more popular.

Until 1996, it also was used as the post parade song for the Belmont Stakes, the third race in of horse racing's Triple Crown. Then, the management of the Belmont, trying to appeal to a younger demographic, decided to alter tradition and changed the post parade song to "New York, New York". As a result, there was speculation that a jinx had fallen over any horse attempting to win the Triple Crown. Although four horses between 1979 and 1996 had already failed to win the Triple Crown after winning the Kentucky Derby and the Preakness Stakes, another eight horses failed after the song was changed, seven as competitors, and one, I'll Have Another, who was scratched the morning of the race because of lameness. It was said that the ghost of Mamie O'Rourke would never let another Triple Crown winner emerge unless and until The Sidewalks of New York was reinstated as the post parade song for The Belmont Stakes. The alleged curse ended when American Pharoah won the Triple Crown with his wire-to-wire win at the Belmont Stakes on June 6, 2015.

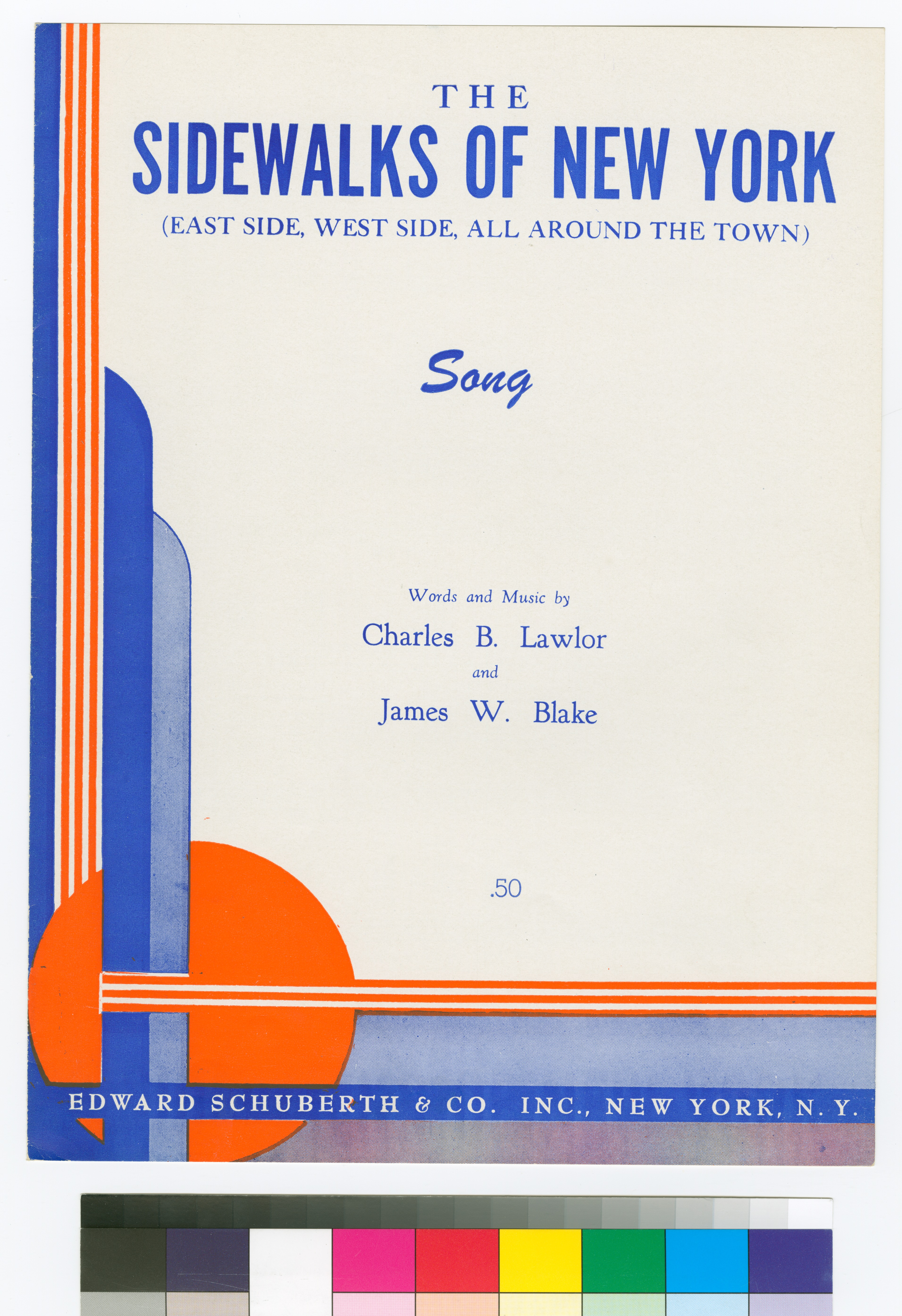
Sheet music, c.1941

Max Fleischer and his brother Dave Fleischer made a cartoon The Sidewalks of New York with the song in 1925, using the DeForest Phonofilm sound-on-film process. The Fleischers re-released the song on 5 February 1929 with a new soundtrack in the RCA Photophone system. Both cartoons used the "follow the bouncing ball" gimmick.

Although the song achieved cultural success shortly after its release, its two authors had sold its copyright to Howley, Haviland, and Company, and earned only $5,000 for their efforts. Lawlor died penniless in 1925, and Blake was also destitute when he died in 1935, with their song reportedly still selling 5,000 copies annually at the time of Blake's passing.

After the deaths of Blake and Lawlor, Sidewalks of New York continued as a standard among jazz artists, namely Mel Tormé and Duke Ellington (in 1941), and recorded by musicians of various backgrounds. The song entered the public domain in 1950, at which time it was estimated to have sold two million copies.

The Sidewalks of New York appeared in a 1954 medley (along with two other 1890s songs, "Daisy Bell" and "The Bowery") in a version by Don Cornell, Alan Dale, and Buddy Greco. Bing Crosby included the song in a medley on his album On the Sentimental Side (1962). It is also a standard among barbershop quartets.

The durability of the song was demonstrated once again in 2011, on the tenth anniversary of the terrorist attacks of September 11, 2001, when recording artist Richard Barone and collaborator Matthew Billy wrote additional lyrics to reflect the fallen towers and honor the victims of the attack. While celebrating the perseverance of the city itself, the revised song was released as a single (The Sidewalks of New York 2011), receiving strong airplay and favorable reviews.

== Lyrics ==
While variations exist depending on the artist performing the song, the chorus has remained consistent. The original lyrics are as follows and contain an ethnic slur in the first verse, referring to Italian sidewalk organ grinders. In later versions, this term was replaced by "Tony", a popular Italian name, to maintain the spirit of the original without the use of derogatory terminology.

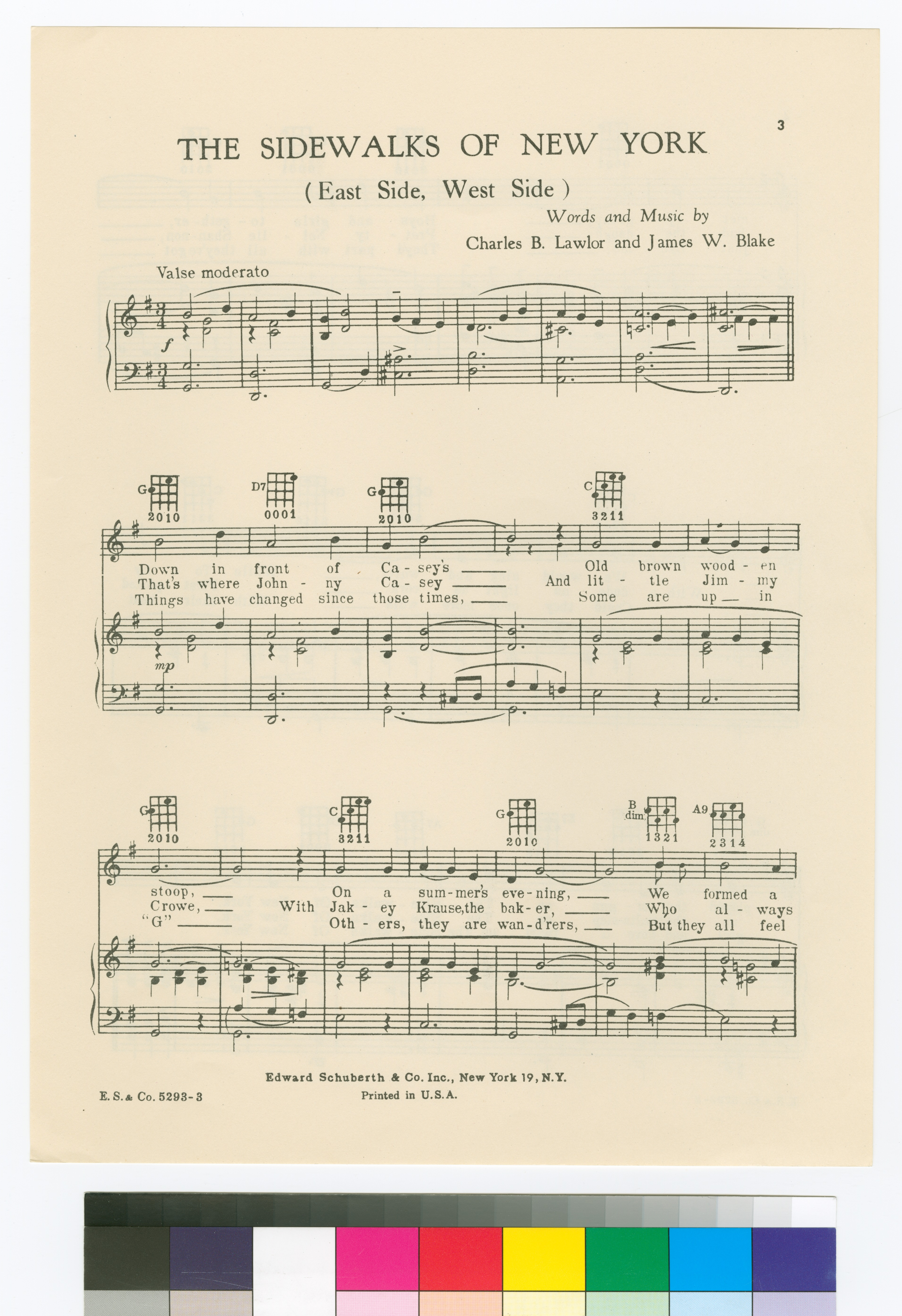
Score

Down in front of Casey's old brown wooden stoop
On a summer's evening we formed a merry group
Boys and girls together we would sing and waltz
While the Guinea played the organ on the sidewalks of New York

East Side, West Side, all around the town
The tots sang "ring-around-rosie," "London Bridge is falling down"
Boys and girls together, me and Mamie O'Rourke
Tripped the light fantastic on the sidewalks of New York

That's where Johnny Casey, little Jimmy Crowe
Jakey Krause, the baker, who always had the dough
Pretty Nellie Shannon with a dude as light as cork
She first picked up the waltz step on the sidewalks of New York

Things have changed since those times, some are up in "G"
Others they are wand'rers but they all feel just like me
They'd part with all they've got, could they once more walk
With their best girl and have a twirl on the sidewalks of New York

== Other commercial uses ==
In 1923, a film was made based on the song. The song is featured in a scene in the 1934 Shirley Temple film Little Miss Marker. Another film released in 1934 that features the song is the drama film Manhattan Melodrama, in which it is played by a band on the ill-fated steamboat General Slocum, moments before it catches fire and sinks in the East River on June 15, 1904, which was New York's worst disaster until 9/11.

In the 1950s, the tune was used for a commercial jingle advertising the Hot Shoppes restaurants (owned by J.W. Marriott) in the Washington, D.C., area. The words were: "East side, west side, all around the town/Wherever you look for a place to eat, a Hot Shoppes can be found/Take a bus or streetcar, or drive right up to the door/Hot Shoppes food is the kind that always brings you back for more." Another 1950s' jingle used the song to advertise Rheingold Beer: "East side, west side, all around the town/Rheingold extra dry beer is the beer of great renown/Friendly, freshening Rheingold; always happily dry/The crisp, clean taste you want in beer is in Rheingold extra dry." Lastly, it was used in Old Gold cigarettes tap-dancing commercials.

In the mid-1950s, the song was used for TV commercials in an anti-littering campaign. The commercial showed an Irish New York City cop strolling along the sidewalk, twirling his nightstick, finally standing alongside a garbage can, as he sang,

East side, West side, All around the town,

Now there’s something wrong with our city

It’s the trash that’s on the ground.

Now we’ve got to get together,

And sure as my name is O’Rourke,

We’ll use these fine litter baskets

On the sidewalks of New York.

In the 1957 film Beau James Mayor James J. Walker of New York City, played by Bob Hope, sings the song to convince New Yorkers that he is one of them and should be retained as mayor.

In 1960, WABC-TV Channel 7 children's show host Ed Bakey used the song as the theme for his tramp clown character, "Tommy Seven", with the lyrics:

East Side, West Side,

All around the town.

The kids watch Tommy Seven

He's their fav'rite TV clown.

He's got a nose that's magic,

A pushcart loaded with fun.

So let's watch Tommy Seven

For the show has just begun.

While not using the song itself, the title of the 1960s TV series East Side/West Side, starring George C. Scott; set and filmed in New York, used the familiarity of the lyrics to establish the series' location.

In the 1970s, the song was again used for a radio jingle. This time the client was the Scull's Angels taxicab company, which has long since ceased to exist. The radio ad was very popular, and gave the cab company more business than they could handle. At that point they took it off the air. It was sung by a singer, Herb Wasserman, who had a very gruff voice, and an over the top New York cabbie accent. The lyrics were written by prolific jingle writer Joan Wile and produced by Don Elliott productions.

The lyrics were:

"East Side, West Side, All around the town.
Scull's Angels will take ya, back and forth, and up and down,
We'll take ya to the theater, and the airport.
We'll pick ya, up at ya door.
'cause Scull's Angels will stick-to-the-streets-and-not-drive-all-over, the sidewalks of New York."

(lyrics used by permission of the writer)

This song is sung by John Thackery (Clive Owen) while learning to ride a bicycle on The Knick, which is set in New York City in 1900.

The song is also used in the first few scenes of the film adaptation of Mary Higgins Clark best selling novel, All Around The Town.

A version by Blondie was used in the ending montage of the HBO drama The Deuce.

There is a 1981 live album by Bob James recorded at different concert locations in New York City called All around the town.
