= Lottie Gilson =

American singer

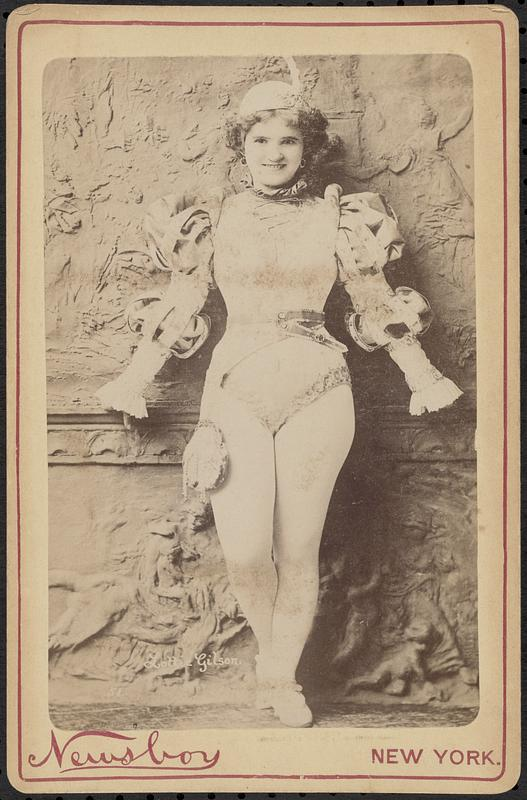
- Lottie Gilson, ca. 1890–1895; from the Cabinet Card Collection of the Boston Public Library
- Born: Lydia Degen; January 2, 1862; Basel, Switzerland
- Died: June 10, 1912 (aged 50); New York City, U.S
- Occupations: Vaudeville singer, comedian

Lottie Gilson (born Lydia Degen; January 2, 1862 – June 10, 1912) was a popular Swiss-born American comedian and vaudeville singer of the 1880s and 1890s. She was billed as "The Little Magnet" in recognition of her ability to attract and engage audiences. Due to her popularity, she was much sought after by Tin Pan Alley publishers to boost sheet music sales. Songs particularly associated with Gilson include "The Sunshine of Paradise Alley", "The Little Lost Child", "The Sidewalks of New York", and "My Mother Was a Lady". Her come back song "Just a Plain Little Irish Girl," is the only known surviving recording.

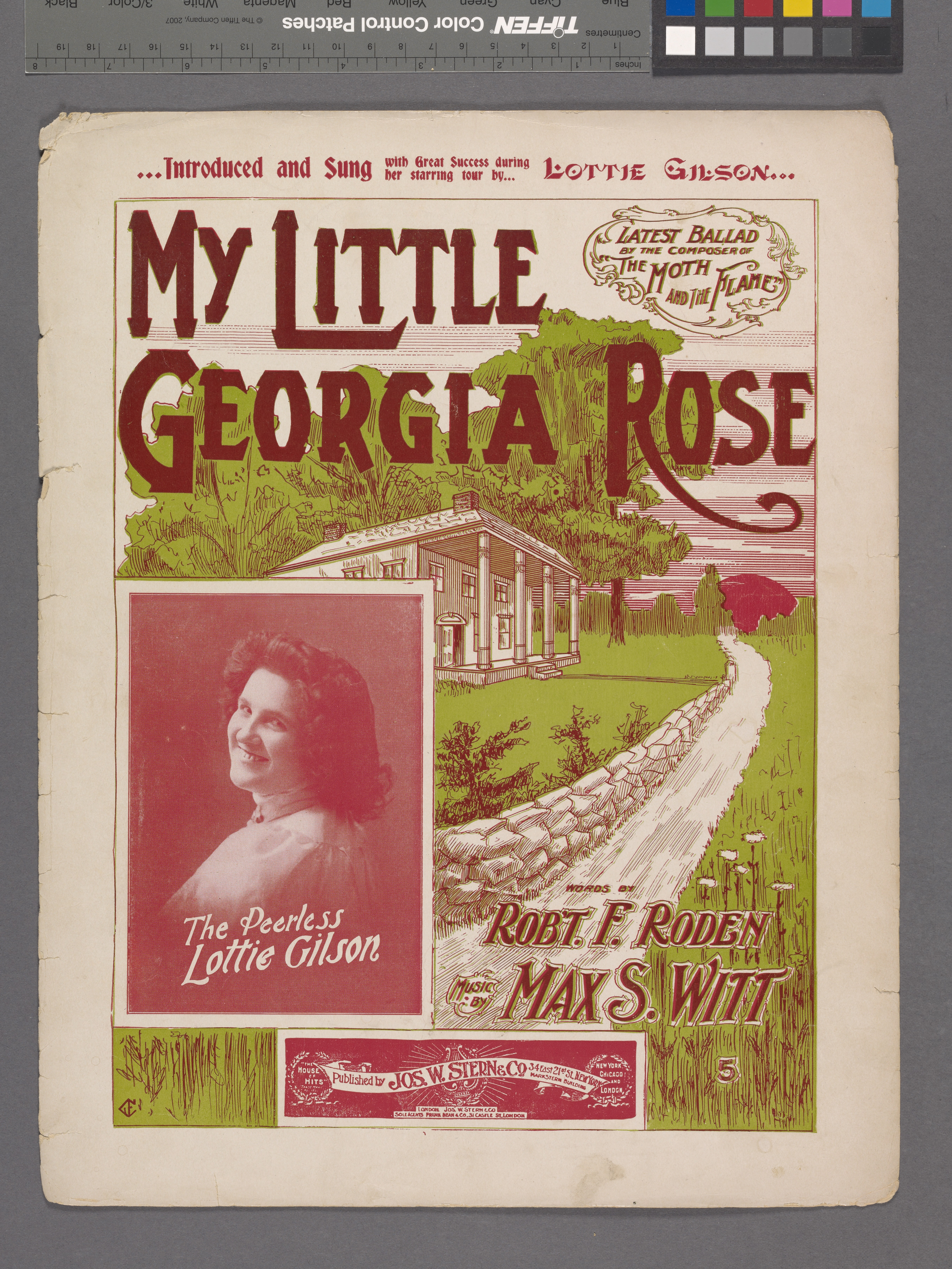
Photograph of Lottie Gilson on "My little Georgia Rose" cover

== Career ==
She was born Lydia Degen in Basel, Switzerland. She emigrated to the United States with her parents as a young child. Many details of her early life are unknown, including when she made her stage debut. The first record of her performing is in 1884, at the Bowery's Old National Theatre, where she became a regular act. Her success at Old National led eventually to engagements at top New York theaters of the day: Tony Pastor's, Henry Miner's, and Hyde & Behman's. She was soon established as one of the top soubrettes of vaudeville. She appeared at Miner's Theatre and Tony Pastor's new 14th Street Theatre in Lower Manhattan and Hyde and Behman's Theater in Brooklyn. She took the name Gilson from that of her first husband.

Like many vaudeville stars, Gilson was known not for her singing talent, but for her personality and showmanship. Her rapport with her audience and talent for attracting customers earned her the nickname "The Little Magnet", which became part of her billing. In the beginning, her act was mainly ballads and tear-jerkers; the sentimental ballad "The Sunshine of Paradise Alley" (1895) was especially identified with her. After a few years she expanded into bawdy comical songs, such as "You're Not the Only Pebble on the Beach" (1896). She pioneered methods of engaging the audience that were so widely copied they became cliches. One was the use of a hand-mirror to reflect the spotlight into the audience, shining it on likely male customers and thus making them a part of her act. The practice of cajoling the audience to sing along on the chorus was another of Gilson's trademarks. She is credited as introducing a staged variation of audience participation which involved a teenage boy in the balcony—ostensibly a customer, but really a shill—who is suddenly inspired to sing with or to the performer. Gus Edwards was one such balcony-singer who contributed to Gilson's act.

Gilson was also in the forefront of another vaudeville practice, taking money (Note: Other inducements were offered besides money: Shapiro Bernstein gave her a $500 diamond ring to sing their songs.) from Tin Pan Alley sheet music publishers to promote songs by including them in her act. Her popularity made her very attractive to publishers, who could be sure that songs would be heard and appreciated by a large audience when she sang them. According to publisher and songwriter E.B. Marks, Gilson could "draw tears from an audience with a perfectly vapid song". Marks's "The Little Lost Child" (1894) was one of the many successful songs plugged by Gilson. Her promotion also played a role in the success of "The Sidewalks of New York" (1894); she introduced it in her act at Miner's London Theatre in the Bowery, employing her method of encouraging the audience to sing along at the chorus.

== Personal life and death ==
She was married three times; after an early marriage to Gilson, she married J. K. Emmett Jr., and finally Salvatore De Nufrio. She underwent several passages of depression before her death, on June 10, 1912, in New York City, at the age of 50.
