= Hoffritz for Cutlery =

Specialty retail chain in New York

- Founded: 1932
- Defunct: 1996
- Successor: Lifetime Hoan
- Headquarters: New York
- Key people: Edwin Jay Hoffritz (founder), Federal's chain, Leonard and Joel Silver (owners 1975-end)
- Products: Cutlery, Swiss army knives, scissors, specialty retail

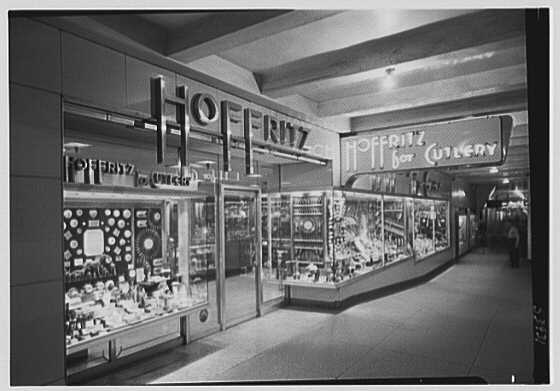
Underground location at 33rd St in Manhattan, 1948

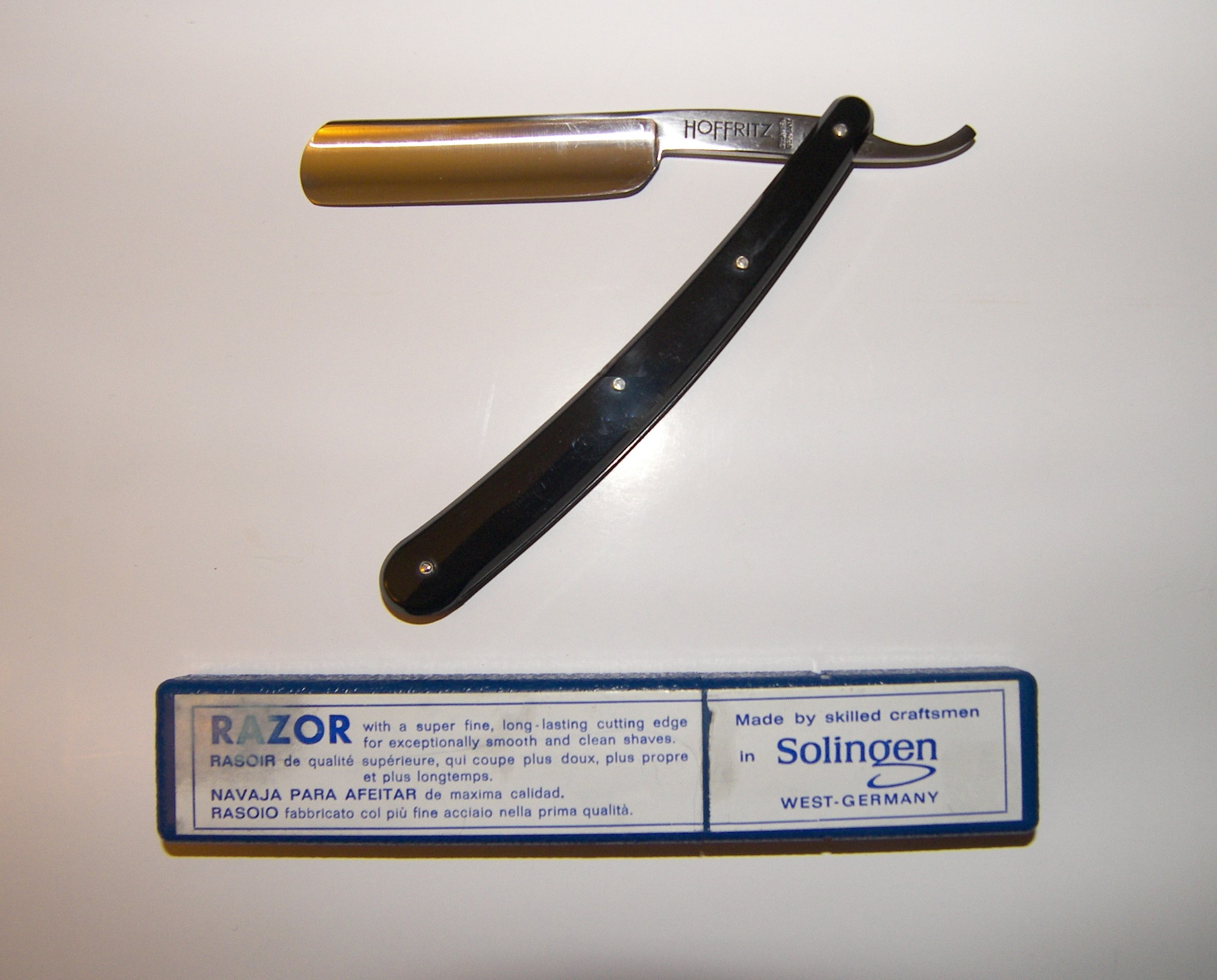
A Hoffritz branded straight edge razor.

Hoffritz for Cutlery was a specialty retail chain selling cutlery, primarily in the New York metropolitan area. Founded in 1932 in New York City, it grew slowly into a 23 store chain by the mid-1970s. After being bought out of the Federal's bankruptcy in 1975, it grew further, reaching a peak in the early 1990s of 110 stores in 33 states. But the rapid expansion, and a failed attempt to go public, led to the company's bankruptcy in 1994.

== History ==
Edwin Jay Hoffritz (1895-1973), born in Ridgewood, Queens, got his first job as a cleaner at a Manhattan cutlery business, and became a cutlery expert. He would travel to Europe annually as a buyer for a department store. Eventually, he left the store around 1928 and started a cutlery business as "Hoffritz & Boschen", located in the Hotel McAlpin at 1292 Broadway. By 1932, the store was just Hoffritz. A 1941 profile of Hoffritz in the Brooklyn Eagle, when he now had three locations, wrote that "hundreds in all walks of life now beat a track daily to his shops at 551 Fifth Ave., 331 Madison Ave., and 1292 Broadway. He has any kind of scissors from a dainty silver one-inch blade affair with which proud clumsy fathers can safely trim the fragile pink nails of a new-born baby, to the fierce-looking machete or dagger. As for knives: housewives can stock a kitchen with dozens of styles of paring, peeling and slicing knives" among many others. He also offered countless types of pocketknives as well.

By 1951, the business had grown to six retail locations.

The Federal's chain eventually acquired Hoffritz. Federal's filed for bankrtupcy in 1972, at which time the Hoffitz chain consisted of 23 stores: 16 in New York, three in New Jersey, and one store each in Connecticut, Florida, Texas, and Wisconsin.

In 1975, brothers Joel and Leonard Silver bought Hoffritz out of the Federal's bankruptcy proceedings in a leveraged buyout. Growth then continued. As of February 1984, the chain had 52 locations in 15 states. By 1990, the chain was up to 81 stores. It also bought the assets of Cutlery World, Inc., a 95-store chain (mostly in California and Florida) that had gone into bankruptcy.

Soon after, at its peak, it had grown to 110 stores in 33 states, with sales of nearly $50 million per year. But expansion plans went awry, and a planned public stock offering was rejected. In 1992, the company had sales of $18.4 million, and reported a loss of $2.6 million. Complaints were made that the Silvers paid themselves too handsomely. The chain filed for bankruptcy in August 1994. By December 1994, only five stores remained, all in the New York City metropolitan area.

In September 1995, Lifetime Hoan acquired the rights to the Hoffritz name, planning to market products under the name in other stores and via catalogs. The remaining Hoffritz stores were required to close or change their name by January 31, 1996.

== Products ==
Hoffritz was well known for selling Swiss Army knives. Near Hoffritz's end in 1993-94, its Swiss Army knife suppliers cut them off for non-payment. Precise International resumed supplying them on a "pay as you go" basis (despite still being owed a significant sum), knowing it was their only chance. Precise's president said "The names of Hoffritz and Swiss Army knives are synonymous, so if we had decided not to ship to them, they would die."

== In popular culture ==
At the beginning of episode twelve of the third season of the sitcom Seinfeld, Jerry Seinfeld's stand-up routine begins with "Every mall has a Hoffritz in it." This episode was initially aired in December 1991, at the height of Hoffritz's expansion.

In Ian Fleming's short story "James Bond in New York" (1962) Bond muses that he should visit "Hoffritz on Madison Avenue for one of their heavy, toothed Gillette-type razors, so much better than Gillette's own product". Hoffritz razors are also mentioned in the book The Man with the Golden Gun, as a gift from Felix Leiter to James Bond.

Hoffritz knives were used in the 1980 slasher movie He Knows You're Alone.
