= Federal's =

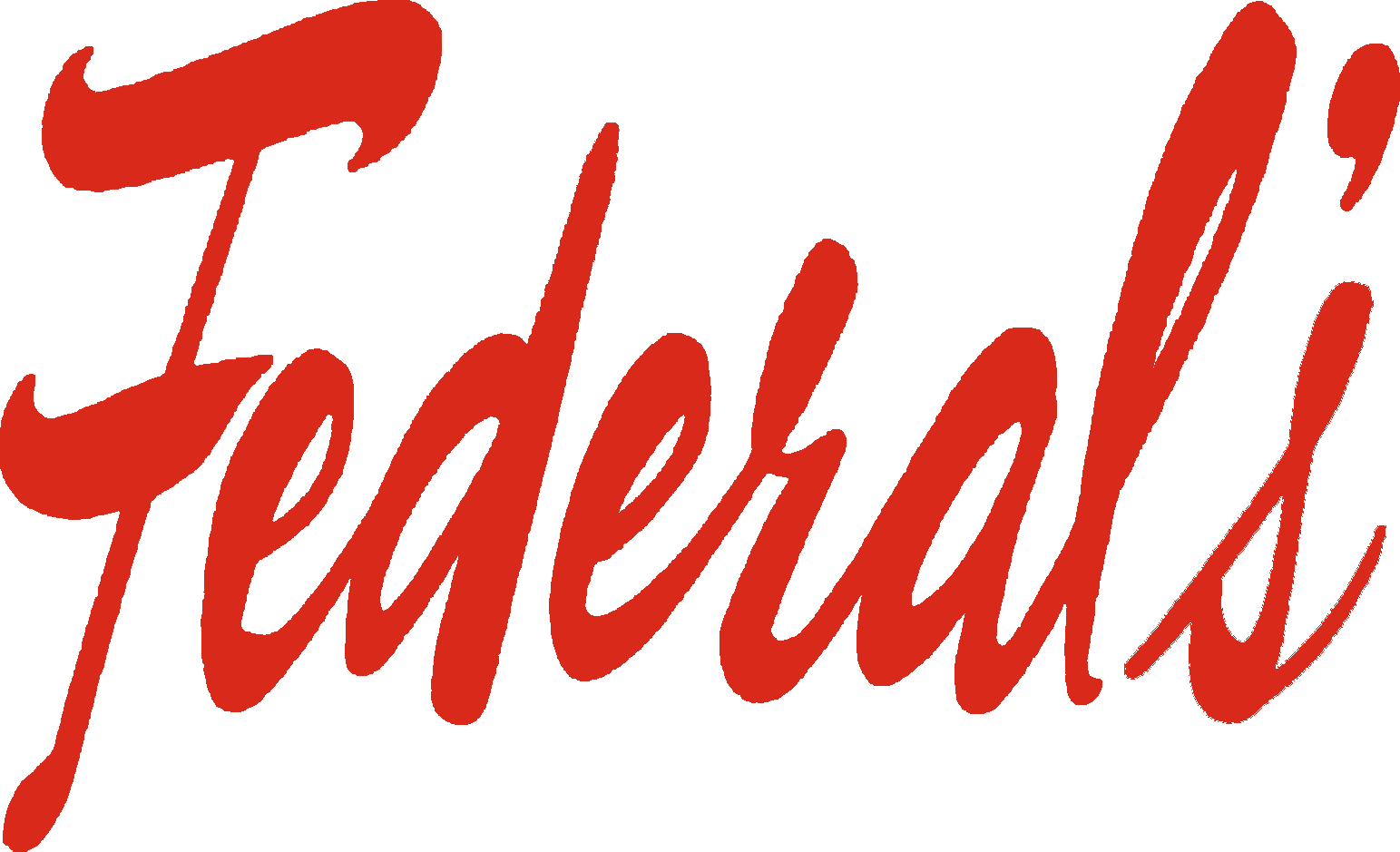
- Company type: Private
- Industry: Retail
- Founded: 1929; 97 years ago in Detroit, Michigan
- Founder: Davison brothers
- Defunct: 1980; 46 years ago
- Fate: Liquidation
- Number of locations: 54
- Area served: Metro Detroit
- Products: Clothing, household goods

Federal Department Store, or Federal's, was a department store chain based in Detroit.

== History ==
Federal's was founded in 1929. In 1961, Federal's merged with Kobacker's of Columbus, Ohio and in 1969, it bought Shifrin-Willens Jewelers. The chain filed for bankruptcy in 1972. That same year, the Federal's stores in Lansing and Kalamazoo were closed. Steven Watstein, also known as Steven West, purchased Federal's in 1978. The chain was liquidated in 1980.

One of Federal's holdings at the time of the bankruptcy was the Hoffritz for Cutlery chain, which was sold off in 1975 in a leveraged buyout.
