= Al Smith 1924 presidential campaign =

American political campaign

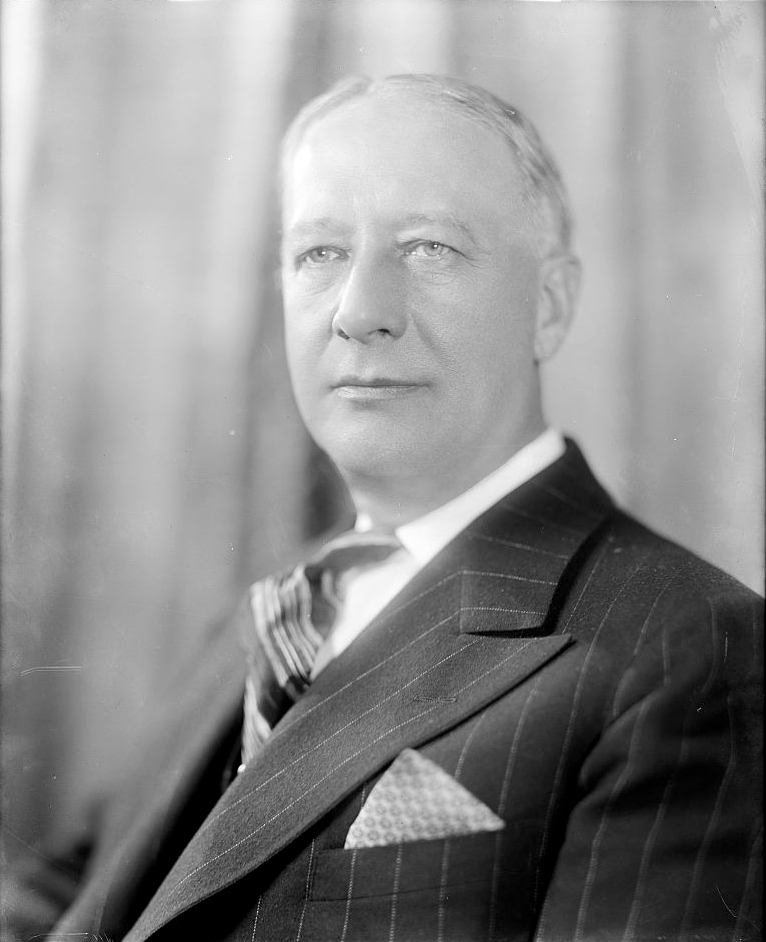
- Campaign: U.S. presidential election, 1924
- Candidate: Al Smith; 42nd Governor of New York (1919–1920; 1923–1928)
- Affiliation: Democratic Party
- Status: Announced in early 1924; Lost nomination at convention
- Headquarters: Prudence Building in New York City; Albany, New York
- Key people: Charles Francis Murphy (campaign manager); Joseph M. Proskauer (campaign manager); Robert Moses; Belle Moskowitz; Franklin D. Roosevelt (chairman)

Al Smith, Governor of New York, was a candidate for Democratic nomination for President of the United States in the 1924 election.

== Background ==
Smith had previously made a quixotic bid for the Democratic nomination at the 1920 Democratic National Convention, where his nomination received an invigorating seconding speech by Franklin Delano Roosevelt, who also served as Smith's floor manager at the 1920 convention. Roosevelt, who had campaigned for Smith's gubernatorial campaign in 1918, was chosen by the New York Democratic Party to second Smith's 1920 bid for the nomination. One contributing factor to this had been Roosevelt's friendly relationship with Tammany Hall leader Charles Murphy While Smith had lost the 1920 nomination, Roosevelt was himself nominated as the vice-presidential running-mate of James M. Cox.

Subsequently, that year, Smith lost his reelection campaign in the New York gubernatorial election. However, in 1922, Smith decided to campaign again for the governorship. His candidacy for Governor was launched after Roosevelt published an open letter calling for him to run. Smith's political ally Robert Moses used his position in the New York State Association to boost Smith's candidacy, publishing partisan attacks on his opponent Nathan L. Miller in the Association's monthly publication (the State Bulletin). Smith won the election by a broad margin, breaking the record for the largest plurality of votes in the history of New York gubernatorial elections. Smith additionally managed to carry all the other Democrats running for statewide office to victory along with him.

== Campaign ==
By early 1924, Smith began preparing an effort to again seek the Democratic nomination. Leading the effort was Tammany chief Charles Murphy.

The campaign's early planning largely was organized in Albany, New York, which functioned as the location campaign's initial headquarters.

It was apparent that Smith's main opponent seemed to be Senator William Gibbs McAdoo of California, the son-in law of former president Woodrow Wilson. McAdoo had, throughout 1923, been viewed as the heavy frontrunner for the nomination. McAdoo aimed to return Wilsonian Progressivism to the White House. However, in April 1924, Smith received a letter from Joseph Tumulty. Tumulty had been the secretary of Woodrow Wilson, who had just passed-away. Tumulty informed Smith that Wilson had been thinking of him in his final days, telling Smith that Wilson spoke favorably, "of everything you are seeking to do, and, I might say frankly, I felt while talking with him that he was a most responsive audience."

In garnering delegates, Smith benefited from the support of the Tammany Hall political machine, as the state of New York fielded 90 delegates to the convention.

By early April, Smith's prospects looked strong. He was ahead in the early delegate count, with 123 proclaiming their commitment to support him, including the entirety of New York's 90 delegates. McAdoo had only 65 delegates committed to him. With the Democratic National Convention scheduled to take place in Madison Square Garden, Al Smith and his supporters were hopeful that he might manage to secure the nomination before a hometown audience.

However, on April 25, Smith's campaign took a major hit. Charles Murphy had died. Smith continued his candidacy. Others, such as Joseph Proskauer and Belle Moskowitz, took Murphy's place in running the campaign, with Proskauer serving as the new campaign manager.

Franklin Roosevelt also contributed to the campaign. Charles Murphy had arranged for him to have a prominent role within the campaign. Roosevelt actively campaigned to secure Smith the support of delegates. Smith's close political confidante Belle Moskowitz was distrusting of Roosevelt, viewing him as a threat to her aspirations to one day see Smith in the White House. However, the rest of Smith's inner-circle disagreed with her assessment of Roosevelt, and instead viewed him as harmless and relatively naive. In truth, while he acted loyally to Smith, Roosevelt was also using his role as a campaigner for a presidential candidate as a means to develop and maintain relationships with key party members across the nation that would be important to him when he would run for president himself, as he was already making plans to do. Roosevelt even had his own timeline, intending at the time to run for Governor of New York in 1932 and president in 1936.

On May 13, the campaign opened new headquarters inside the Prudence Building in New York City.

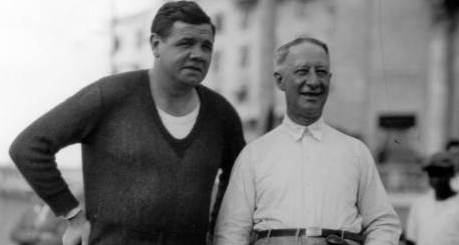
Babe Ruth publicly supported Smith

Roosevelt contacted Yankee slugger Babe Ruth, asking for his endorsement of Smith. Ruth, impressed by the narrative Roosevelt provided him of Smith's political journey as a rags-to-riches tale, obliged to provide a public endorsement of Smith's candidacy.

Smith encountered criticism for his Catholic faith. No Catholic had ever before been nominated for president by a major political party. Roosevelt, being the scion of a well-known Protestant family, was an advocate capable of providing greater credibility to Smith's candidacy amongst audiences that were skeptical towards the implications of Smith's Catholicism. Smith was, at times, reluctant to rely so strongly on Roosevelt as an advocate for his candidacy. However, Smith was urged by his aide Joseph Proskauer to accept Roosevelt's help. Proskauer, reportedly, told Smith, "you're a Bowery mick, and he's a Protestant patrician and he'd take some of the curse off you."

Smith also encountered criticism for his strong association with the Tammany Hall machine, and his anti-Prohibition stance. In July, James Cannon Jr. of The Nation wrote,

Governor Smith is personally, ecclesiastically, aggressively, irreconcilably Wet, and is ineradicably Tammany-branded, with all the inferences and implications and objectionable consequences which naturally follow from such views and associations.

== Convention ==
Heading into the convention, Smith was seen as a frontrunner for the nomination. His main competition came from William McAdoo. McAdoo was supported by the Ku Klux Klan, who at the time were a significant player in the Democratic Party. McAdoo did not repudiate the Klan's support. McAdoo supported prohibition. Smith, meanwhile, was the leader of the anti-KKK and anti-prohibition wing of the Democratic Party.

Smith stood for cities, immigrants, the repeal of prohibition, religious diversity, and new perspectives on governments role in society. All of these were issues which elicited strong opposition from the Ku Klux Klan, helping ignite its members against his candidacy.

=== "Happy Warrior" Speech ===
Roosevelt again acted as Smith's floor manager and delivered Smith's nominating speech. The speech which he delivered has been dubbed the "Happy Warrior" because, alluding to William Wordsworth's poem Character of the Happy Warrior, Roosevelt referred to Smith as, "the happy warrior of the political battlefield".

Roosevelt had himself objected to the speech he delivered. Being preoccupied with securing the support of delegates, he had asked Joseph Proskauer to write a speech for him. Proskauer, obliged to Roosevelt's request, and provided him with a speech that he had already written for Roosevelt. Roosevelt, however, balked at the speech, particularly objected to the line referencing the work of Wadsworth, which Roosevelt believed was far too poetic for a political audience. Proskauer refused to remove that line from the speech. Roosevelt countered Proskauer's objections by writing a speech on his own. He then quibbled of Proskauer over what speech he was going to deliver at the convention. Proskauer and Roosevelt sought a third opinion to resolve their disagreements, and solicited Herbert Bayard Swope's opinion. Swope first read the speech that Roosevelt had prepared and stated that it was the worst speech that he had ever read. He then read Proskauer's speech and acclaimed it as the greatest speech since Edward S. Bragg's seconding of Grover Cleveland at the 1884 Democratic National Convention. Roosevelt still continued to object to the "Happy Warrior" speech, and only begrudgingly relented to recite it after Al Smith intervened and issued him an ultimatum to either deliver the "Happy Warrior" speech or deliver nothing at all.

The speech, delivered around noon on June 26, was Roosevelt's first public major appearance since he contracted polio in the summer of 1921. Roosevelt "walked" from his seat (amongst the New York delation) to the speakers podium by holding the arm of his son James with his left arm and leaning on a crutch with his arm. Once he reached the stage, he grabbed a second crutch, and swung himself onto the speaker's platform, and then "stood", tightly holding onto the podium. The speech lasted 34 minutes, and was met with a resounding applause.

=== Battle over the party platform ===
Following the nomination speeches, a battle broke out over the party platform. Smith's wing of the party aimed to pass a plank in the party platform condemning the KKK by name, and declaring it to be "un-American". Senator Oscar Underwood of Alabama, who was hoping to be a dark horse candidate if the convention deadlocked, joined with Smith's allies to champion the adoption of the anti-KKK plank. Underwood formally introduced the plank before the convention.

The Klan immediately denounced Underwood, calling him the, "Jew jug, and Jesuit candidate" (jug a reference to Underwood's support for the repeal of prohibition).

McAdoo's wing of the party, which vehemently opposed the plank, saw the support of three-time presidential nominee William Jennings Bryan in opposing the adoption of the plank.

Underwood and Smith's allies refused to accept any compromise on the plank, demanding it be adopted without any softening of its stance. They pushed the issue to a vote, igniting violent discourse amongst the convention's delegates. For hours, speaker after speaker rose to voice support for the plank, or to defend the clan as being a relatively harmless organization with only a few bad actors. Supporters were met with loud applause from the many Tammany loyalist attending the convention, while those opposed were met with heavy jeering from the Tammany loyalists. The final speaker to voice their opinion on the subject was William Jennings Bryan. A strong orator, Bryan took to the stage to demand an end to the attack on the Klan. He demanded the convention put an end to further debate over "three little words" (Ku Klux Klan). He proclaimed that, "we can exterminate Ku Kluxism better by recognizing their honesty and teaching them that they are wrong".

Just before midnight on the night of June 28, the voting began on whether the convention would ratify the proposed plank. Police provided crowd control on the convention floor, preventing delegates from assaulting one another. The voting was chaotic, and lasted more than two hours. The plank ultimately failed by only a single vote. More than half the votes against it came from western and midwestern states.

By the end of this process, the stances of each candidates had been boldly underlined. Al Smith stood in strong opposition to forces of intolerance. McAdoo had the support of not only those who didn't condemn the Klan, but also of the Klan itself.

=== Balloting ===
McAdoo had entered the convention completely expecting to leave the nominee. However, Smith's candidacy blocked his nomination.

McAdoo's supporters' chants of "Mac! Mac! McAdoo!" were mockingly met by Smith's supporters cheers of "Ku Klux MacAdoo!", while various fights and obscenity-laden screaming matches took place throughout the balloting process.

Balloting began on June 30, with nineteen candidates receiving votes on the first ballot: favorite sons prevented either Smith or McAdoo from securing even a simple majority, let alone the two-thirds required to win the nomination.

Amidst the many roll calls, William Jennings Bryan took to the podium requesting time to address the convention and explain his own vote. His remarks wound up lasting an hour, in which he ultimately announced his support of William Gibbs McAdoo, who he called the architect of the party's "progressive convention" and "progressive platform". In response to jeers from Smith supporters, Bryan attacked them proclaiming that, "You do not represent the future of this country." These remarks would ultimately prove to be Bryan's last convention speech, as he died a year later.

Having reached a stalemate, the convention ultimately nominated John W. Davis as a compromise candidate. The entire convention lasted for 103 ballots over sixteen days.

== Aftermath ==
Davis would go on to lose the election. Smith would run again in 1928, successfully securing the Democratic nomination, but losing the general election. Smith would additionally seek the presidency in 1932, but would fail to garner the nomination that year, losing it to Franklin Roosevelt.
