= James W. Blake =

American lyricist (1862–1935)

- Born: September 23, 1862; New York City, New York, United States
- Died: May 24, 1935 (aged 72) New York City, New York, United States
- Genres: Popular music
- Occupation: lyricist
- Years active: c. 1885–1935

James William Blake (23 September 1862 – 24 May 1935) was a lyricist who is most famous for the words to the 1894 song, "The Sidewalks of New York".

== Early years and family ==
Blake was one of seven children of Michael and Elizabeth Blake, immigrants from County Westmeath, Ireland. He and his siblings were all born in Manhattan, in their family home at 312 East 18th Street, just off Second Avenue. James Blake went to P.S. 40 in Manhattan, worked as a stock boy and office boy in various drapers' shops, then went to evening school and became a real estate agent. His oldest brother, Michael F. Blake, a classmate of Charles F. Murphy and James A. Foley, was first a news reporter, then went to law school, joined his former classmates and Tammany Hall, and became a City Court judge for 20 years.

== Career, songwriting, and lyrics to Sidewalks ==
Blake became a hat salesman, and songwriting was only a hobby, which he turned to when sales were slow. One day in 1894, Charles Lawlor, a friend who was also a well-known vaudevillian and singer, walked into John Golden's hat store on Third Avenue between East 13th and East 14th Streets to visit Blake, humming the melody that became The Sidewalks of New York. Blake took a liking to the 3/4 tune, and had him repeat it several times. "You get the music on paper," he told Lawlor, "and I'll write the words for it." Lawlor returned to the store in about twenty minutes with the musical notes on paper, and Blake was halfway through the lyrics, having been interrupted by a customer. He finished the words in another half-hour. The tune and words became extremely familiar and well-known throughout New York City. It was first made famous by Lottie Gilson, and it had staying power because the melody was catchy and easy to sing.

The words were a shared vision of Lawlor and Blake, and recall their childhood neighborhoods and those who grew up with them. It was a universal longing for youth, yesteryear, and place, although it was also idealized because both Lawlor and Blake had grown up quite poor. Lawlor said that he envisioned a "big husky policeman leaning against a lamppost and twirling his club, an organ grinder playing nearby, and the east side kids with dirty faces, shoes unlaced, stockings down, torn clothes, dancing to the music, while from a tenement window an old Irish woman with a checkered cap and one of those old time checkered shawls around her shoulders, looking down and smiling at the children." The children's names in the lyrics were those of Blake's childhood friends. The song became popular right after it was published, and decades later had a huge renaissance when Al Smith used it as his theme during his three failed presidential campaigns in 1920, 1924, and 1928.

Over the years, Blake wrote the words to many songs, including some others with Lawlor, such as "Pretty Jenny Slattery", "Every Boy Has Quarreled with His Sweetheart", "The Best in the House is None Too Good for Reilly", "I Did My Drinking When The Drinking Was Good", but none came even close to matching the popularity of "The Sidewalks of New York".

== Personal life and later years ==
The rest of Blake's life was much tougher than his big hit suggested. He married a girl from Brooklyn named Ida McBurney and they had two children, but both died in infancy and Ida died after only two years of marriage. He and Lawlor sold the rights to "The Sidewalks of New York" for $5,000 to the music publishers Howley, Haviland, and Dresser, so they did not get any residuals. Lawlor died blind and penniless in 1925. Blake worked for many years selling hats, velvets, and related items, including at Macy's and at Shendell and Co.

In 1932, Blake joined his two surviving siblings, Mary and John, in an apartment on Walton Avenue in the Bronx. However, by January 1933 they had no money and were evicted from their building. They even walked the sidewalks and streets he had written about, and spent time in Pennsylvania Station just to keep warm. But he remembered being interviewed several years earlier by Ishbel Ross of the New York Herald Tribune, so he got in touch with her. When his story became known, Smith, who had by then retired from politics, arranged for the Emergency Unemployment Relief Committee to provide an apartment for the three Blakes at 407 West 22nd Street, and Max Mayer, who then owned the rights to Sidewalks, arranged for the American Society of Composers, Authors and Publishers to provide a $25 weekly pension even though Blake had never even been a member of the organization. When Blake became ill, Smith arranged for him to be hospitalized at St. Vincent's Hospital in New York City, where he died of stomach cancer several weeks later.

He was buried in a family plot in Calvary Cemetery in Queens.
