= Charles B. Lawlor =

American composer (1852–1925)

- Born: 2 June 1852; Dublin, Ireland
- Died: 31 May 1925 (aged 72) New York City, New York, United States
- Genres: Popular music
- Occupation: Songwriter
- Years active: c.1870–1925

Charles B. Lawlor (June 2, 1852 – May 31, 1925) was an American vaudeville performer and composer of popular songs. He was born in Ireland and emigrated to the United States in 1869. Lawlor is primarily remembered today as the composer of the 1894 song, "The Sidewalks of New York," a song for which he wrote the melody. The lyrics are by James W. Blake (23 September 1862 – 24 May 1935). Although the song was popular immediately after it was written, Lawlor, as well as the lyricist, Blake, rose to renewed prominence when the song became the theme song of the 1928 Democratic presidential candidate, Alfred E. Smith. Lawlor was part of a vaudeville team with songwriter and performer James Thornton.

Lawlor's other compositions include: "You’re the Best Little Girl of Them All", "Irish Liberty", "Pretty Peggy", and "The Mick Who Threw the Brick".
