= Falconwood Club =

19th century club and resort in Buffalo, Grand Island, New York

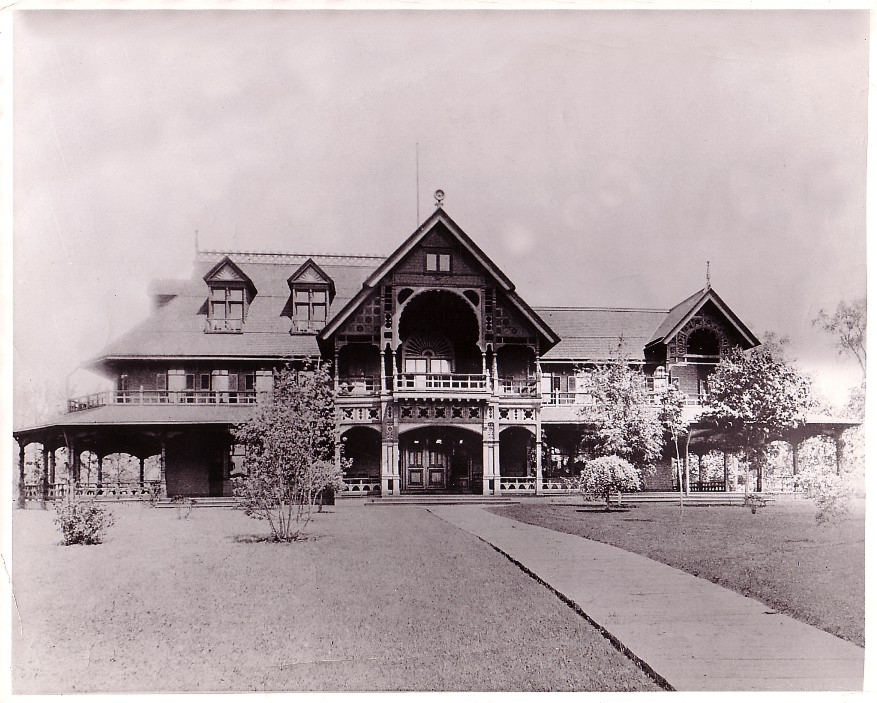
- Formation: 1858
- Founder: Lewis F. Allen
- Dissolved: c. 1920s (burned down)
- Headquarters: Grand Island, New York
- Members: Private

The Falconwood Club was a club and resort in the 1800s for the wealthy families of Buffalo on Grand Island in New York.

== History ==
On June 19, 1858, the Falconwood Club, located near the head of the island, was organized by Lewis F. Allen, uncle to President Grover Cleveland. The club took its name from the eagles and hawks which nested in the surrounding trees. Allen had subdivided the property he owned on Grand Island and built the Club. At the time, it was called the "Allen Mansion", but it emerged as a public resort.

By June 1865, Falconwood was closed to the public as it had become the property of the "Falconwood House Company". The group was called "The Falconwood Club" and two log houses. Falconwood continued to flourish as one of the most popular of the Grand Island clubs of the last quarter of the 19th century. Each member was allowed two weeks at the club every summer under the terms of the membership. For the most part, the week days were stag affairs. Families would spend their summer weekends at the club, with businessmen making the daily run to Buffalo and back on a launch, which would drop them in the center of the city at the foot of Main Street.

Near the turn of the century, Falconwood became the property of George E. Matthews, of the Buffalo Courier-Express (who died in 1911). Under his ownership, the house continued to serve as a private club and estate for his family and friends until it was destroyed by fire in the twenties.

== Clubhouse ==
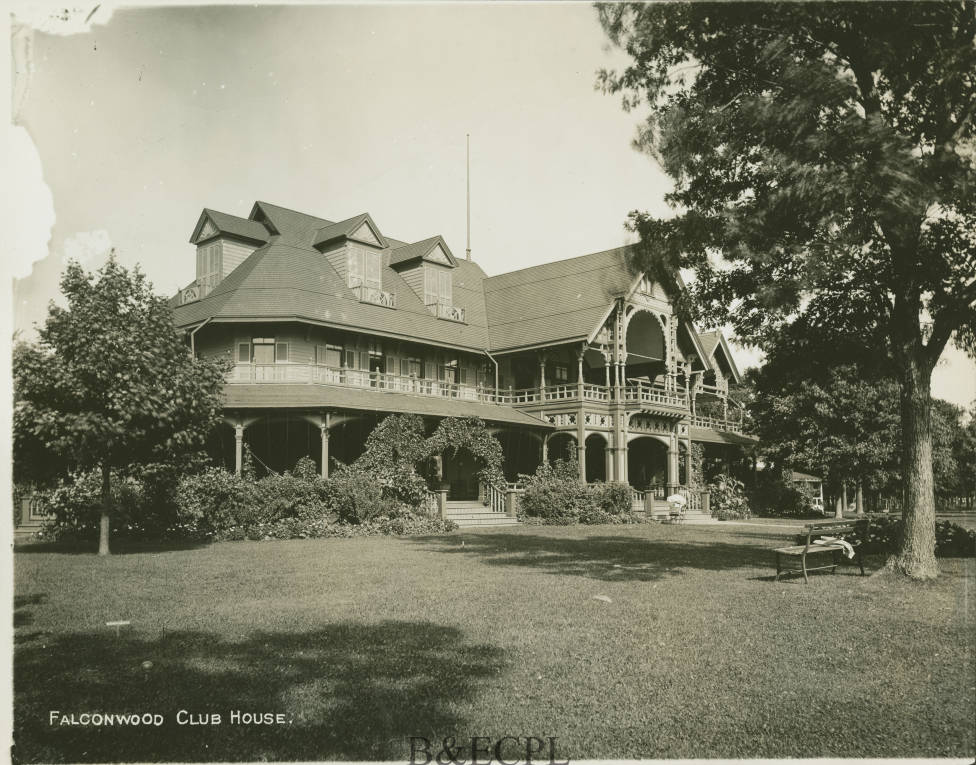
Falconwood Club House

The Falconwood Club clubhouse was built in 1879 to the designs of Milton Earle Beebe, a prominent Buffalo architect at a cost of $15,000. That building was destroyed by fire in the early morning of July 10, 1882. Later that year, Buffalo architect Eugene L. Holmes was hired to rebuild the clubhouse which opened on August 16, 1883 and was constructed at a cost of $23,000.(References: "At Falconwood: The formal Opening of the New Club-house Last Evening", Buffalo Morning Express, Aug. 28, 1879, p. 4; "The Falconwood Club House Destroyed", Buffalo Evening News, July 10, 1882, p. 16; "Falconwood, Description of the Splendid Club-House in the Course of Erection on Grand Island", Buffalo Commercial, Apr. 28, 1883, p. 3; "Fair Falconwood. The New Club House and Other Attractions", Buffalo Evening Telegraph, Aug. 21, 1883, p. 1; History of the City of Buffalo and Erie County with Illustrations and Biographical Sketches of Some of Its Prominent Men and Pioneers vol. II (Syracuse, NY: D. Mason & Co, Publishers, 1884): pp. 547-548.)

=== Exterior ===
The Villa style (later known as Queen Anne) club was located on a 45-acre tract overlooking the West River. The main building, a two-story building clubhouse was 60 x 40 ft. It was built entirely of wood with steep gabled roofs and the exterior was painted gray, with the long slant of the roofs painted a bright red. The front, facing the river, was dominated by a large heavily ornamented central projection that appeared to be Moorish in detail.

The clubhouse featured a 12-foot veranda that ran the full length of the building, providing a view of the well-kept lawn sloping down to a wharf which projected 110 ft. into the river. At its height, the property consisted of forty-five acres in grounds, laid out with ornamental trees and flowers. The property was dotted with many large old growth trees, with trunks four to five ft. thick.

=== Interior ===
On the ground floor, large double doors admitted guests to a broad vestibule and hall with an imposing staircase that could be seen leading to the second floor. All the rooms on the main floor were paneled in natural wood. The stained glass in the doors and the windows was in shades of amber, brown, red and gold, which accented the natural tones of the wood. To the right of the vestibule; a 32 x 40 ft. parlor; to the left, a 32 x 40 ft. dining room. Towards the end of the central hall were doors leading to the public bathrooms, kitchens, and pantries.

On the second floor, off the stairwell, there was another large central hall that ran the full length of the house. Outfitted as a second floor sitting room, its large crescent shaped windows looked out on the riverfront on one side and back to the Falconwood Park and forestlands on the other. There were twin halls running parallel to the building's length that ended in French doors leading to the second story verandas. The 12 guest rooms (containing a bedroom and bath) were off these hallways.

=== Outer buildings ===
There was also an elegant bar, a bowling alley, an assembly hall, and numerous guest cottages. There was also a 24 x 20 ft. ballroom in a separate area about 40 ft. away from the hotel.

== Steam boat ==
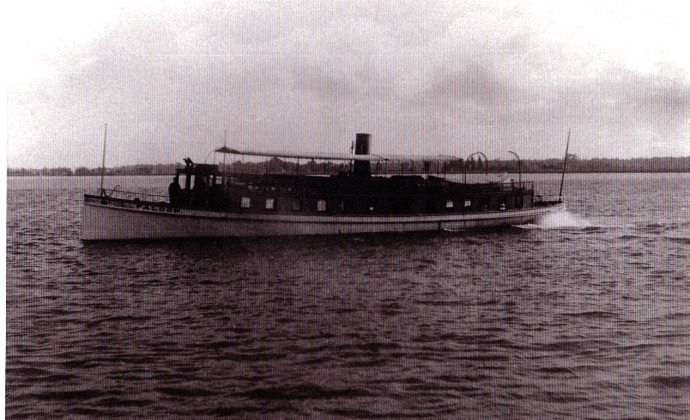
The Falcon, Falconwood Club's steamer built in 1860

The clubs had its own steam launch, as was typical of the resorts on Grand Island at the time. The Falconwood's steamer, built in 1860, was called "The Falcon" and featured a glass-enclosed cabin on the main deck and an awning-shaded promenade deck above. In 1862, the Niagara, and in 1863, the River Queen and Fanny White also began making stops at the Falconwood dock. The Falcon was acquired by the "Falconwood House Company" when they purchased the Club in 1865. The cost was about forty cents per round trip.

== Notable members and visitors ==
- Lewis F. Allen
- Grover Cleveland
- Franklin Sidway
- George B. Hayes
- Nathaniel Rochester
- B. J. Cilley
- Lord John Coloridge
- George E. Matthews

== Other Grand Island clubs ==
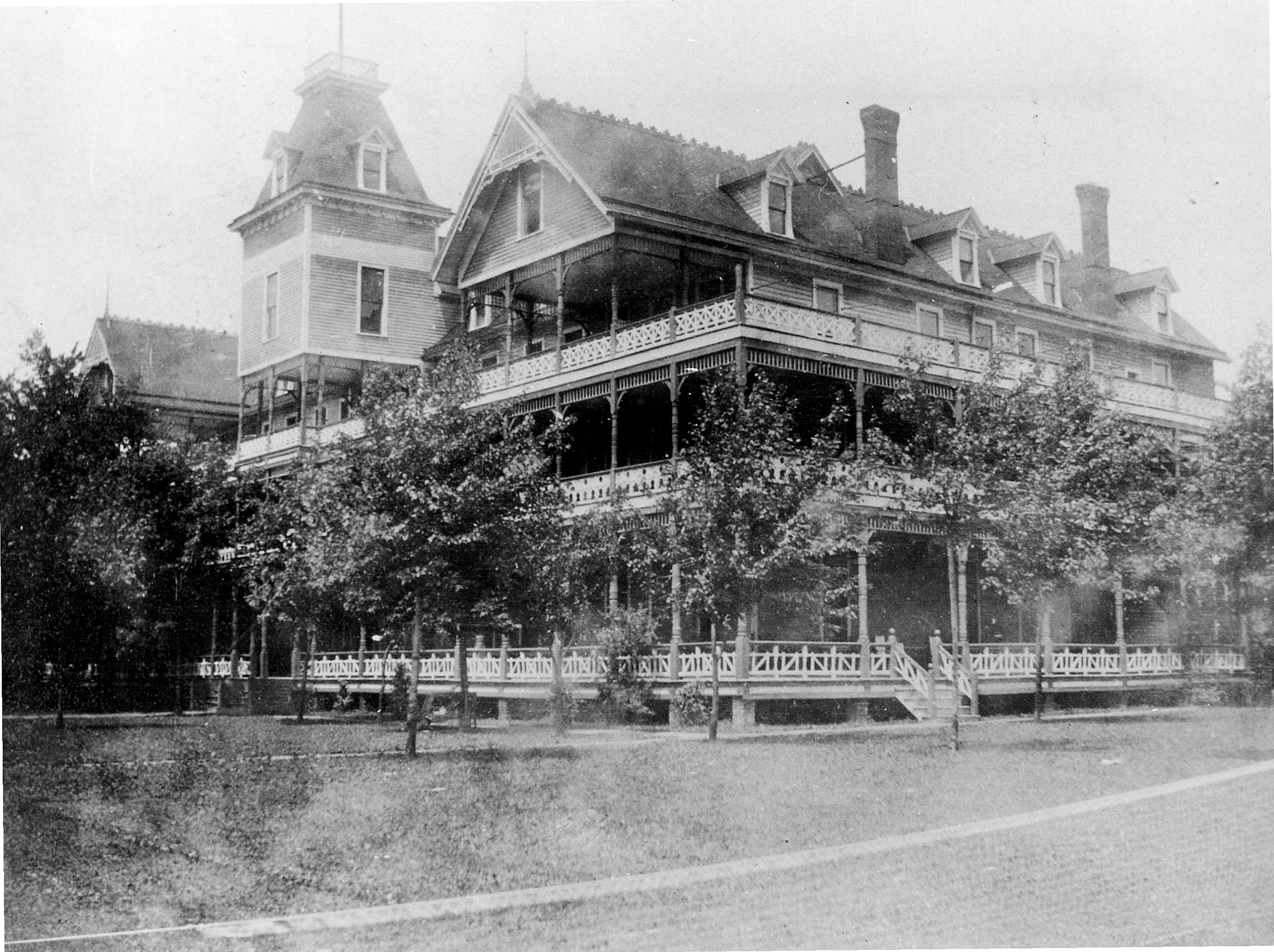
Island Club (McComb House) (1887) - Torn down during the construction of the West River Parkway

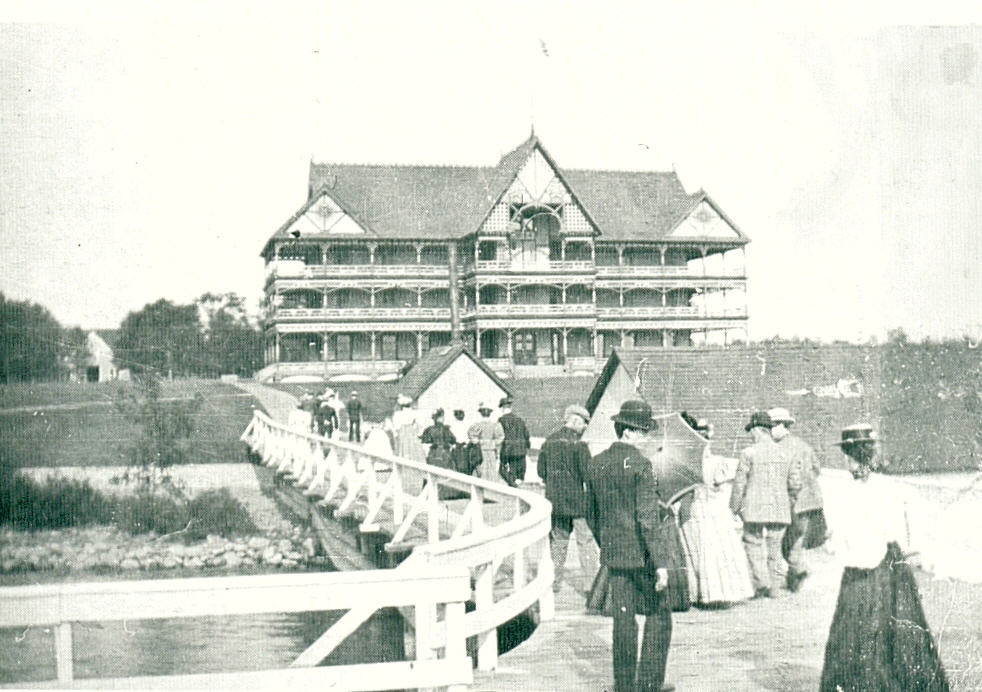
Oakfield Club (1882) - The largest of the clubs (destroyed by fire)

== Present day ==
The State of New York purchased Beaver Island, a large part of the Lewis F. Allen estate, all of the Falconwood lands, plus "River Lawn", the former home of the Spaulding and Sidway families. Together, they became the modern day Beaver Island State Park.

=== Influence ===
Falconwood Subdivision, built in the 1950s and 1960s, was named for the Falconwood Club, which runs from East River Road across the Beaver Island Parkway and extends to Baseline Rd. It is the closest large subdivision to the South Grand Island Bridge.
