= USS Enquirer =

American yacht/survey vessel/freighter

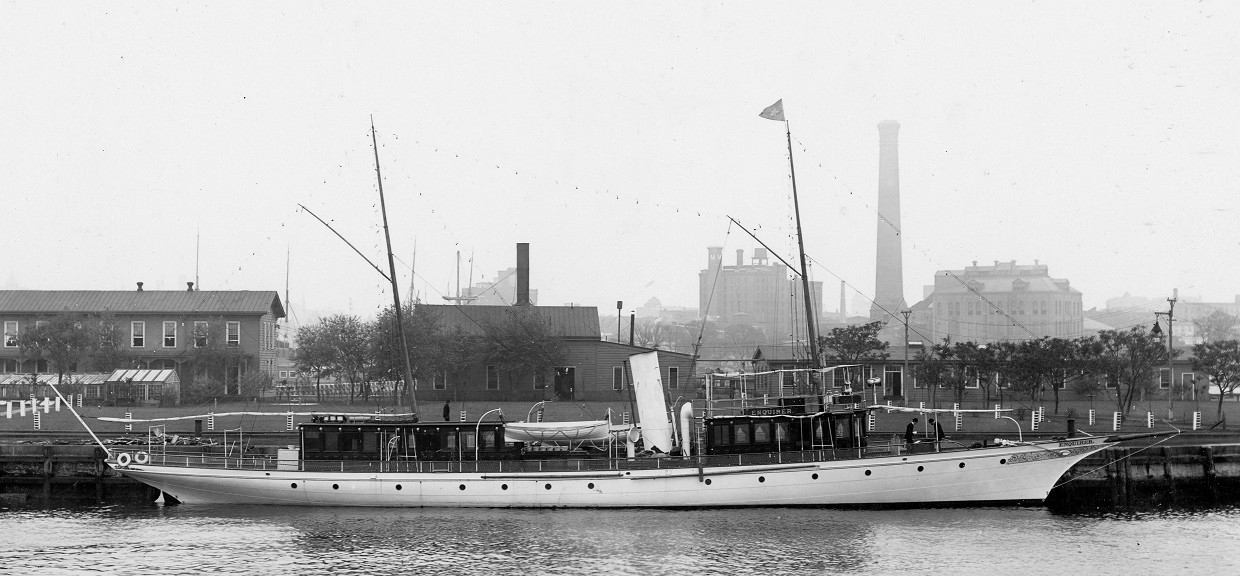
- Enquirer the day after she was acquired by the Navy, still in her civilian livery

History

United States
- Builder: Union Dry Dock Company, Buffalo, New York
- Acquired: 28 May 1898
- Commissioned: 22 June 1898
- Decommissioned: 9 August 1898
- Fate: Broken up, 1943

General characteristics
- Tonnage: GRT: 140 tons
- Displacement: 170 tons
- Length: 133 feet 7 inches (40.72 m)
- Beam: 17 feet 6 inches (5.33 m)
- Draft: 9.25 feet (2.82 m)

USS Enquirer was an armed yacht acquired by the US Navy during the Spanish-American War. Built as a private yacht, she was only commissioned for two months in 1898 before the ship was sold off and transferred to the US Army Corps of Engineers to operate as a survey ship in the Great Lakes and renamed Search. By 1939, she was used as a civilian freighter and broken up in 1943.

== Design ==
Enquirer was built as the private yacht for newspaper mogul William Conners, who owned The Buffalo Enquirer, Morning Enquirer, and Buffalo Courier-Record. The ship had a gross register tonnage of 140 tons, length of 133 feet 7 inches (40.72 m), beam of 17 feet 6 inches (5.33 m), and a depth of either 10 feet (3.0 m) or 18 feet (5.5 m). She was equipped with one propeller. She was built in 1896 by the Union Dry Dock Company in Buffalo, New York.

== Service history ==
On 28 May 1898, the yacht was bought by the US Navy during the Spanish-American War. She was commissioned on 22 June 1898 with the same name and operated from New York while patrolling the American coastline between Newport, Rhode Island and Seabright, New Jersey. The ship was fitted with two 1 pound (0.45 kg) guns and was converted to an armed yacht. Less than two months later on 9 August 1898, she was decommissioned. She was then sold to the Department of War on 20 July 1899 and assigned to the US Army Corps of Engineers on 28 August 1899. Under Army control, she was renamed Search and used to survey waterways in and around the Great Lakes until 1929. By 1939, she was in private ownership and used as a freighter on the Lakes renamed back to Enquirer. She was broken up between 1942 and 1943 at Port Clinton, Ohio.
