= Beaver Island State Park =

Park in New York, United States

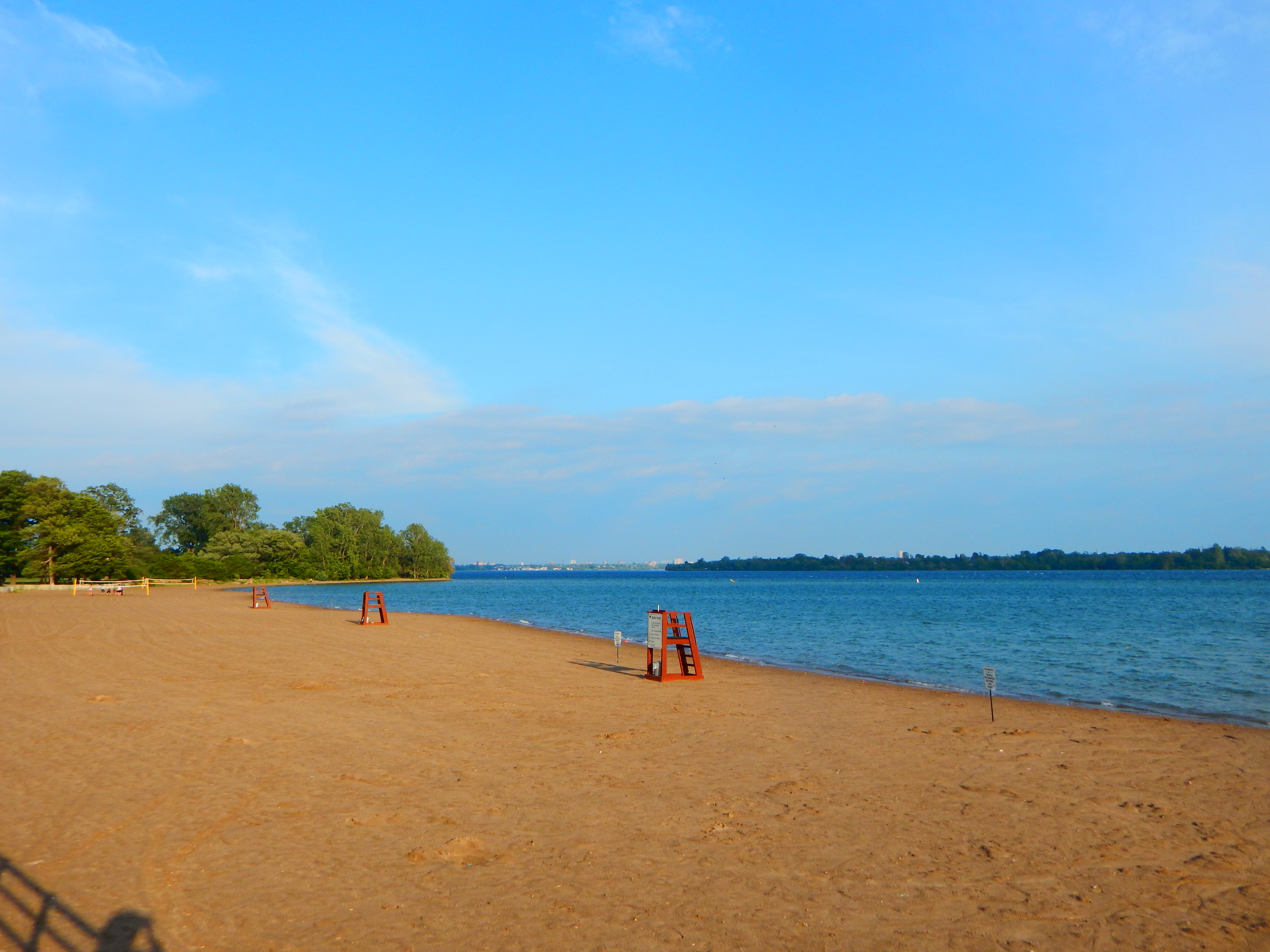
- The beach at Beaver Island State Park in June 2015. Fort Erie, Ontario is visible across the Niagara River.

- Location within New York
- Type: State park
- Location: Grand Island, New York
- Coordinates: 42°58′N 78°57′W
- Area: 952 acres (3.85 km^{2})
- Created: 1935
- Operator: New York State Office of Parks, Recreation and Historic Preservation
- Visitors: 340,781 (in 2020)
- Open: All year

Beaver Island State Park is a New York state park located on Grand Island in northwestern Erie County, New York in the United States. It is situated at the southern end of the island on the bank of the Niagara River and served by the Beaver Island Parkway, a 2.72-mile (4.38 km) highway linking the park to Interstate 190 (I-190).

Included within the park is the Beaver Island State Park Golf Course, a USGA-recognized championship 18-hole, par-72 public golf course.

The park is 1 of 80 New York State Parks that are in the path of totality for the 2024 solar eclipse, with 3 minutes and 43 seconds of totality.

== History ==
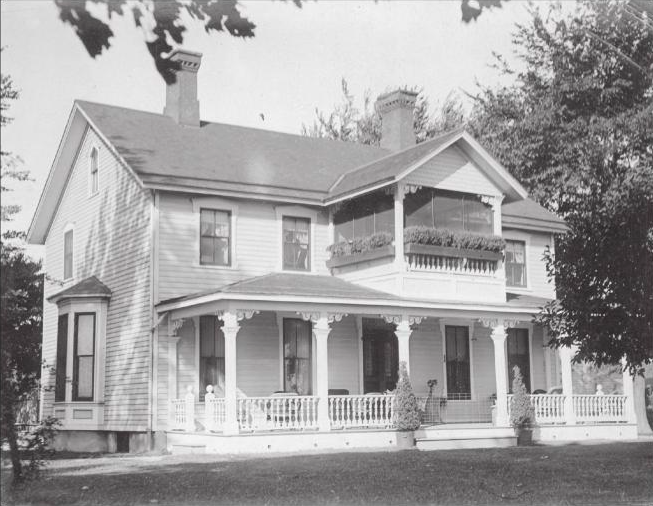
"River Lea," which was built by Lewis F. Allen for his son William

The present-day Beaver Island State Park opened in 1935 and consists of several historic Grand Island estates of Buffalo's elite that were donated to New York State for all Western New Yorkers to enjoy. These grand estates included:

- The Falconwood Club - resort started by Lewis Allen and later owned by George E. Matthews
- River Lawn - summer home and estate of Elbridge G. Spaulding, Franklin Sidway, and later Frank St. John Sidway
- River Lea - summer home of Lewis F. Allen, the uncle of US President Grover Cleveland, is located within the park.

In 2015, it was announced that a new $2 million pro shop with a bar and restaurant and a large, outdoor seating area was coming to Beaver Island Golf Course. It will replace the one destroyed by fire in 2012.

== Recreation ==
The park offers a beach, picnic tables with pavilions, recreation programs, a nature trail, birdwatching (including swans, and herons), seasonal waterfowl hunting, fishing and ice-fishing, sledding, cross-country skiing, cross country running, snowshoeing, sledding and snowmobiling, a boat launch with marina and dockage, and a food concession. The park's nature center is open from noon to 4 p.m. on Friday, Saturday, and Sunday. Attendance at Beaver Island rose to about 279,000 in 2014, up from 269,000 in 2013.

Beaver Island State Park is home to the Blue Heron Disc golf course, an 18-hole, 4,000-yard (3,700 m) disc course completed in 1999.

=== Golf course ===
The Beaver Island State Park Golf Course is a par 72, 6,645 yards (6,076 m) yard USGA-recognized championship course with a slope of 108 and a rating of 70.2. Additionally the forward course is a par 74, 6,201 yards (5,670 m) yard course with a slope of 110 and a rating of 70.1. The latter course is open from April 20 through November 8, weather permitting.

The course was designed by William Harries and Russ Tryon and opened in 1963.

== Beaver Island Parkway ==
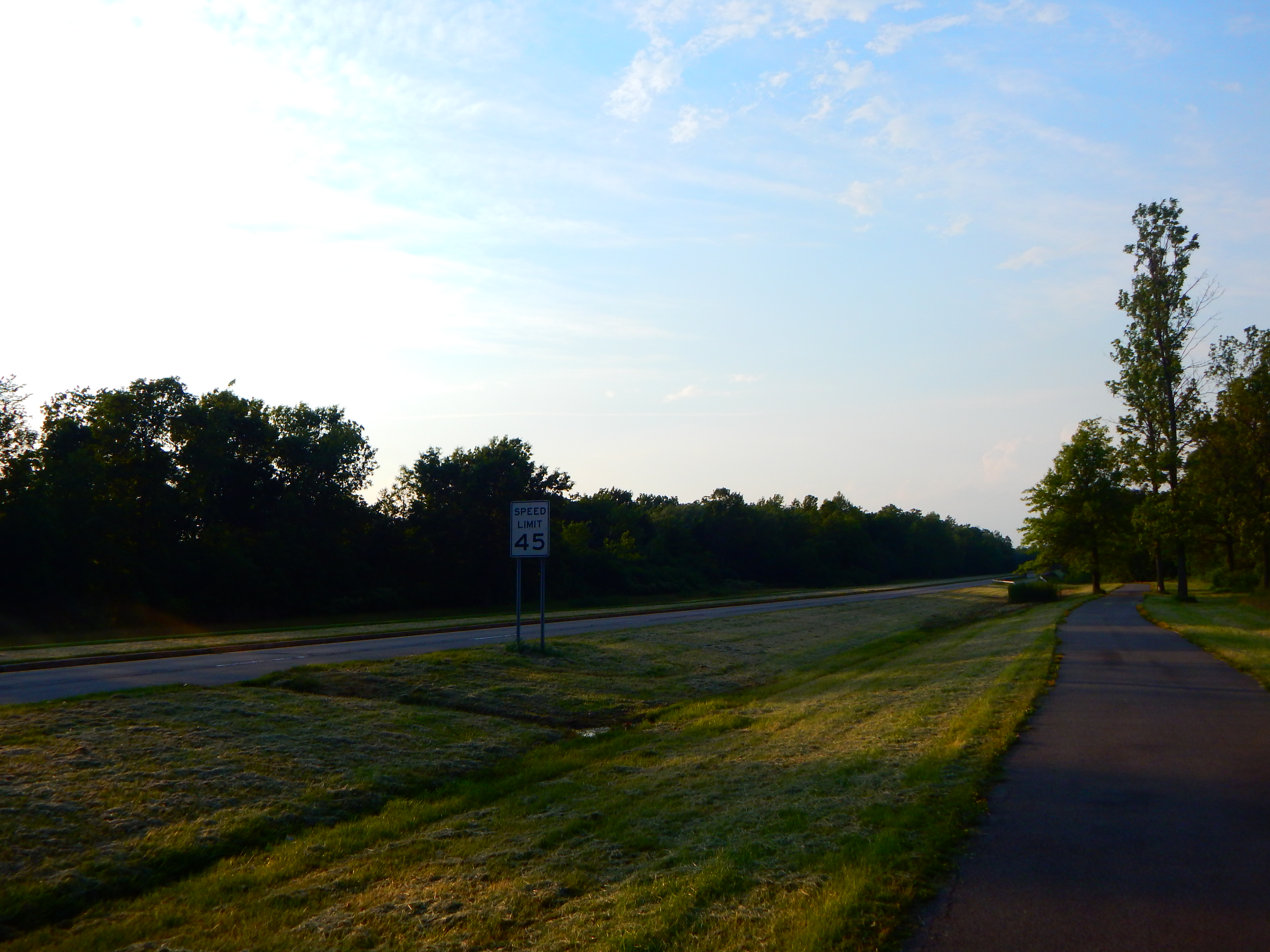
Beaver Island Parkway in June 2015

Beaver Island Parkway
- South Parkway
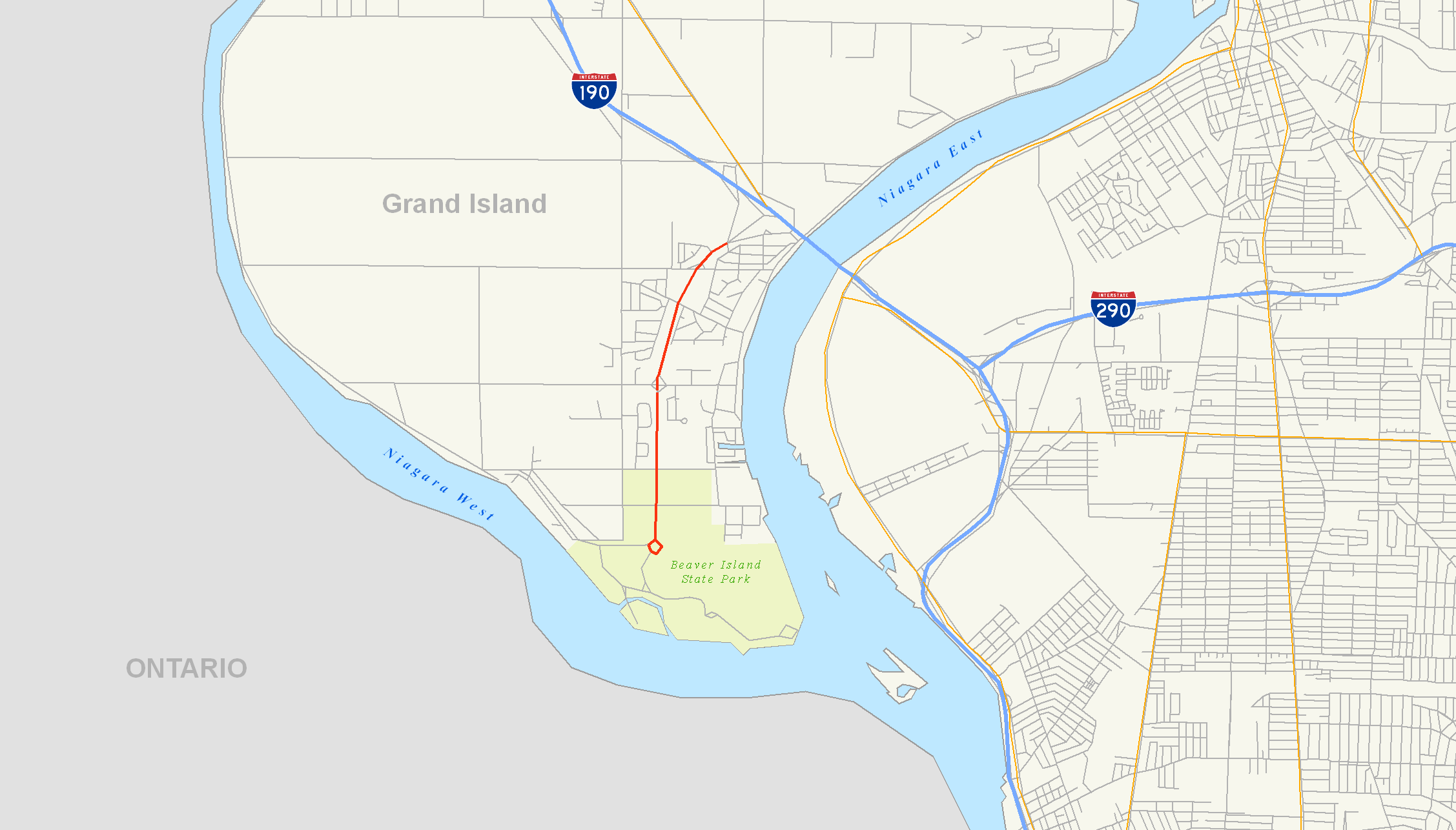
- Map of Beaver Island State Park, with Beaver Island Parkway highlighted in red

Route information
- Maintained by NYSDOT
- Length: 2.72 mi (4.38 km)
- Component highways: NY 957B

Major junctions
- South end: West River Parkway
- North end: CR 11

Location
- Country: United States
- State: New York

Highway system
- New York Highways; Interstate; US; State; Reference; Parkways

The Beaver Island Parkway, also known as South Parkway, is a 2.72-mile (4.38 km) parkway connecting its namesake park to I-190 (the Niagara Section of the New York State Thruway) and New York State Route 324 (NY 324) near the South Grand Island Bridge. This roadway is a four-lane divided expressway, and there are no driveways leading to and from the roadway. However, there are at-grade intersections along the route. The parkway is within the jurisdiction of the New York State Office of Parks, Recreation and Historic Preservation but is maintained and inventoried by the New York State Department of Transportation (NYSDOT) as NY 957B, an unsigned reference route.

All junctions on the route, excluding those with West River Parkway and I-190, are at-grade intersections. At the northern end of the parkway near East River Road, an additional ramp connects to I-190 northbound via NY 324 westbound and Staley Road.

Route description

Beaver Island Parkway begins at a traffic circle with West River Parkway and Park Road at the entrance to Beaver Island State Park. It heads north as a four-lane divided highway, initially passing through wooded areas on the northern edge of the park. As it leaves the vicinity of the park, the woods around the highway gradually give way to residential neighborhoods. The parkway intersects a few local roads as it turns northeast and comes to its terminus at an interchange with I-190 and NY 324.

Major intersections

Location	mi	km	Destinations	Notes
Beaver Island State Park	0.00	0.00	West River Parkway	Traffic circle
Ferry Village	0.50	0.80	CR 577 (Bush Road)	
Grandyle Village	1.97	3.17	CR 548 (Love Road)	
Grand Island	2.31	3.72	I-190 / NY 324 – Buffalo, Grand Island, Niagara Falls	Northbound exit and southbound entrance
Grand Island	2.72	4.38	CR 11 (East River Road)	
1.000 mi = 1.609 km; 1.000 km = 0.621 mi: Incomplete access

== See also ==
- List of reference routes in New York
