= George E. Matthews =

American newspaper publisher (1855–1911)

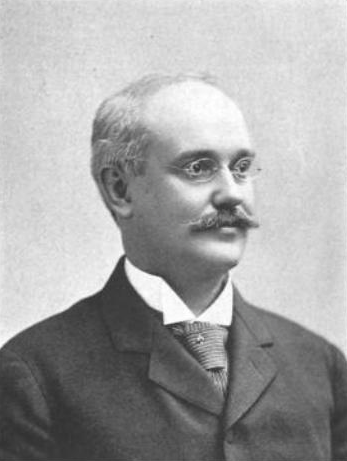
- Matthews in 1898
- Born: George Edward Matthews; March 17, 1855; Westfield, New York, US
- Died: June 11, 1911 (aged 56); Grand Island, New York, US
- Education: Yale University (BA, 1877)
- Occupation: President of Buffalo Courier-Express
- Spouse: Mary Elizabeth Burrows (m. 1887)
- Children: 3, including Burrows

George Edward Matthews (March 17, 1855 – June 11, 1911) was president of the "J. N. Matthews Co.," which published the Buffalo Courier-Express. At the time of his death, Matthews owned the Falconwood Club in Grand Island, New York.

== Early life ==
George Edward Matthews was born on March 17, 1855, in Westfield, New York, the son of Harriet (Wells) Matthews and James N. Matthews, an English born printer and publisher who moved to Buffalo in his youth. Matthews' residence, however, was in Buffalo for most of life. He graduated from private schools at 16. He was too young to enter college, so he started working in the office of the Commercial to understand the practical knowledge of typography. He spent two years at the Commercial and worked as a proofreader and compositor, as well as traveling. He entered Yale University at the age of eighteen, with the class of 1877. While at Yale, he was a member of the Delta Kappa Freshman Society, Delta Beta Xi, Delta Kappa Epsilon, and at Commencement, he received a colloquy appointment.

== Career ==
In 1878, a year after his graduation, his father, J. N. Matthews, bought the Buffalo Express (Samuel Langhorne Clemens, also known as Mark Twain, had been the co-editor of the Express from 1869 to 1871). Matthews started working on January 1, 1878, in the business office to learn the methods of the business department. He began as clerk and climbed the various steps to business manager. He also took a post graduate course in the editorial department, from telegraph editor and city editor to literary editor. Ultimately, he became treasurer of the "Matthews-Northrup Co.," printers and publishers of the Express, of which his father was the sole owner.

In 1888, after the death of his father, the firm of "George E. Matthews & Co." became the owners of the Express, and three years later, it was consolidated with the "Matthews-Northrup Works" into the "J.N. Matthews Co.," the corporation of which Matthews was president.

=== Inventions ===
Matthews invented the "prism print process," a method of printing in four colors that superseded the three color process. He patented a method of indexing books and was the first Buffalo publisher to introduce linotype machines in a newspaper plant. At the time, the plant of the "J.N Matthews Co." in Buffalo was one of the largest in the entire country.

== Personal life ==
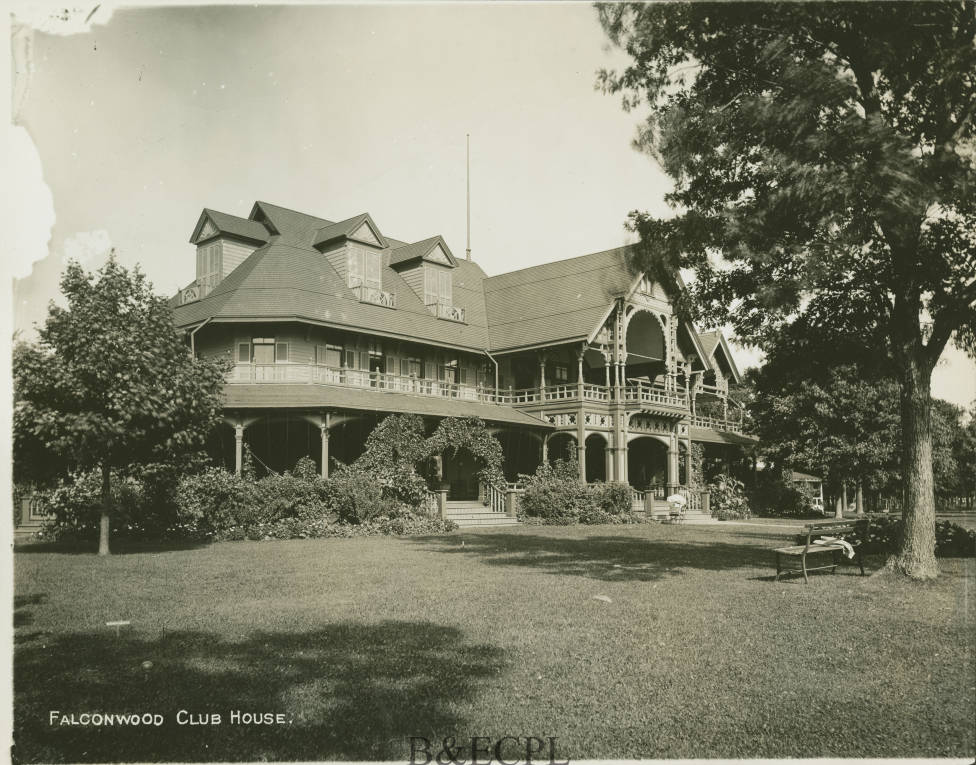
Falconwood - Matthews summer home on Grand Island

On July 12, 1887, Matthews married Mary Elizabeth Burrows of Buffalo. Together they had three children: George E. Matthews Jr.; Harriet Wells Matthews, who married J. Randall Williams, Jr. of "J. Randall Williams & Co." in Philadelphia, Pennsylvania and Northern Central Railway; and Burrows Matthews, publisher of the Buffalo Express and later Buffalo Courier-Express from 1911 to 1955 upon its consolidation.

Although Matthews did not hold elected office, he was a friend and supporter of President William McKinley and was a delegate to the 1896 Republican National Convention. He was appointed by Governor Frank W. Higgins to membership in the McKinley Monument Commission, which erected a memorial in Buffalo to McKinley, who had been assassinated at the Pan-American Exposition in 1901. Matthews was a member of many clubs and organizations, including:

- The Buffalo Historical Society
- The Buffalo Fine Arts Academy
- The Buffalo Yale Alumni Association (past president)

Matthews owned a country estate, called "Falconwood," in Grand Island, New York. Falconwood was the former Falconwood Club, built in 1882 and designed by Joseph Lyman Silsbee, a prominent architect of the time who studied at the first school of architecture in the United States, the Massachusetts Institute of Technology.

== Death ==
Matthews died at his Grand Island home on June 11, 1911, from heart disease, which he had been suffering from for several years. Matthews, who was one of Buffalo's most prominent printers, was for several years president of the Typothetae of the City of Buffalo and of the "Buffalo Newspaper Publishers Association." He was also a part owner in the Buffalo Printing Ink Works.

The honorary pall bearers at the very large funeral at Falconwood included Buffalo publishers and personal friends of Matthews. They were: Edward H. Butler, William J. Conners, Norman E. Mack, Justice Charles Barker Wheeler, Stephen Merrell Clement, Robert B. Adam, William A. Douglas, Edward Michael Loran, J. Lewis, Jr., George R. Howard, George R. Teller, Herman E. Hayd, William B. Hoyt, Arthur D. Bissell, E. H. Hutchinson, George K. Birge, James G. Warren, T. Guilford Smith, George Urban Jr., Frederick L. Pratt, George Bleistein, and Frank B. Baird. The department heads in the "J.N. Matthews Co." constituted the active bearers, including: Leonard W. Wilgus, John F. Koine, Charles H. Thomas, Herman Gentsch, George Smyth, Merton Wiiner, Andrew J. Clerum, Frank L. Hayes, Frederick W. Kendall, William H. Johnson, George E. Williams, Herman H. Graham, Arthur H. Kennett, George Turner, Carl K. Friedman, and John Fisher. Matthews was interred at Forest Lawn Cemetery in Buffalo.
