= Lewis F. Allen =

American farmer and politician

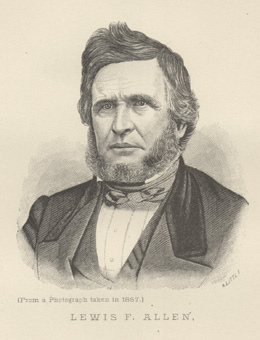
- Lewis F. Allen in 1857

Member of the New York State Assembly from Erie County
- In office January 1, 1838 – December 31, 1838

Personal details
- Born: Lewis Falley Allen; January 1, 1800 Westfield, Massachusetts, US
- Died: May 2, 1890 (aged 90) Buffalo, New York, U.S.
- Resting place: Forest Lawn Cemetery
- Party: Whig
- Spouse: Margaret Cleveland
- Relations: Grover Cleveland (nephew-in-law)
- Children: 6

Lewis Falley Allen (January 1, 1800 – May 2, 1890) was an American farmer, businessman and politician. Allen was the uncle-in-law of President Grover Cleveland and is credited with introducing Cleveland to the practice of law and politics, therefore paving the way for his eventual presidency.

== Early life ==
Lewis Falley Allen was born on January 1, 1800, in Westfield, Massachusetts, the son of Samuel Allen (1777–1855) and Ruth Falley (1776–1826). His grandfather was Captain Richard Falley (1740–1808), partially of French Huguenot descent, who was an American soldier who fought in the Battle of Bunker Hill, built a musket armory at Mt. Tekoa, and was the armorer to the 18th Mass. regiment. Samuel Allen, the youngest of 11 children, was not a farmer, like his father, but went into the mercantile business.

Allen received most of his formal education at the academy in his hometown, finishing in December 1812. When he was 13 years old, he went to New York City and began working for a wholesale importing and jobbing dry goods house as an apprentice. After that summer, he returned to work with his father, who had moved his mercantile business from New York to Connecticut where he manufactured woolen goods.

== Career ==
=== Early career ===
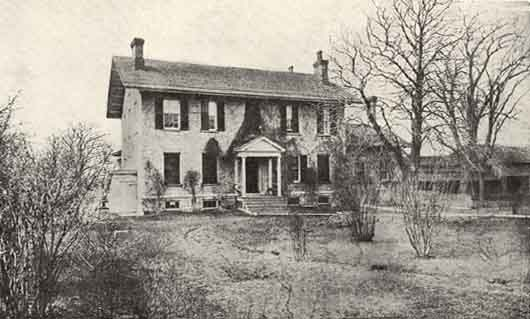
Residence of Gen. Peter B. Porter, overlooking the Niagara River, built 1816 and acquired in 1836 by Allen (demolished in 1911).

In 1818, Allen moved to Sandusky, Ohio, to work for his uncle, who was one of the largest landowners in the area. After three and a half years, Allen returned to New England, where he again worked for his fathers along with his younger brothers. In 1826, they sold the business and all moved to New York again.

In early April 1827, Allen came to Buffalo to serve as secretary and financial manager of the Western Ensurance Company, which was chartered by the New York State Legislature in New York City. At the time, the insurance industry was small and Buffalo was unpaved with no sidewalks and a population under 3,000. Within the next three years, the Western Insurance Company's charter expired, and Allen, along with other local businessmen, obtained a new charter for "The Buffalo Fire and Marine Insurance Company."

In 1829, he bought a farm lot of 29 acres extending from Main Street to the "State Reservation line" of Black Rock for $2,500 (equivalent to $76,000 in 2025). He purchased several other plots of land through auction which were later sold for significant increases in value as old wooden structures were torn and new brick buildings were constructed along with the growing city.

About 1831, Allen was appointed the financial agent of the New York Life Insurance and Trust Company, which authorized him to make loans on their behalf in Erie County, New York. He held this position until 1833 and he made loans of $200,000 (equivalent to $6,242,000 in 2025) in the then village of Buffalo. He made additional loans of $100,000 (equivalent to $3,121,000 in 2025) outside of the city to farms, all of which were repaid in full with no defaults. By 1884, the population of Buffalo had grown from near 3,000 in 1827 to 200,000.

=== Grand Island ===
In 1833, along with some Boston investors, Allen purchased 16,000 acres of forested land on Grand Island, New York, at a cost of around $6/acre. This was practically the entire Island, save 1,700 acres. He subdivided his interests (800 acres), including the establishment of the Falconwood Club, and kept several hundred acres at the head of Grand Island, which he cleared for his own farming purposes. When he did sell his acres to the "Grand Island Park Company," the acres were worth $200/acre.

=== Politics ===
In politics, he was an original Whig, and a pronounced Republican from the formation of the party. He was the first chairman of the first Republican convention in Erie County and was elected to the New York State Legislature in 1838 as a member of the 61st New York State Legislature.

== Personal life ==
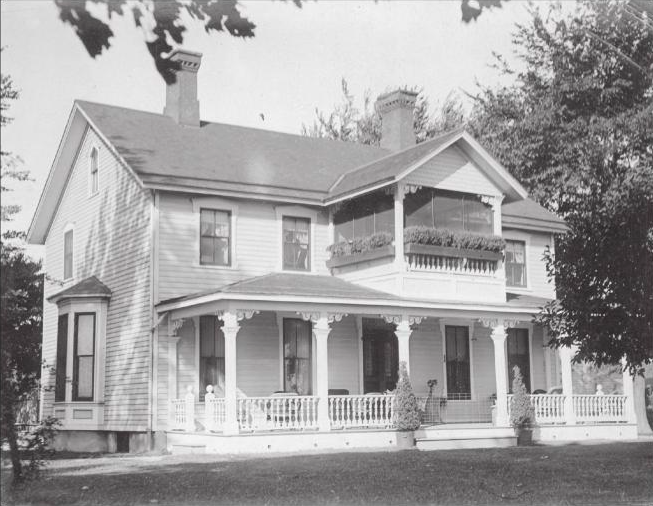
"River Lea" in Grand Island built by Allen for his son William and his bride.

In 1825, Allen married Margaret (Cleveland) Allen (1801–1880). Margaret was the daughter of William Cleveland, then a resident of Norwich, Connecticut. Her younger brother, the Rev. Richard F. Cleveland, a Presbyterian minister, was the father of Grover Cleveland. Together, Allen and Margaret had six children, only two of which reached maturity:

- Margaret Gertrude (Allen) Bailey, who married Dr. Daniel A. Bailey of Buffalo.
- William Cleveland Allen (1837–1913), who married May (Barclay) Allen (1844–1921)

In 1837, Allen and his associates purchased the interests of Gen. Peter B. Porter at Black Rock when Porter abandoned Black Rock for a residence at Prospect Point in Niagara Falls. Allen bought General Porter's home overlooking the Niagara River and was home for the Allens for over 50 years. Porter had built the house in 1816 after his first home was burned during the War of 1812. It stood on present-day Niagara street near Ferry on the bluff high above the river, affording a fine view of the area. John Quincy Adams visited the Allens' home in Black Rock and for a while, Grover Cleveland lived there when Allen convinced Cleveland, on his way to Ohio, to remain in Buffalo to pursue a legal career which led to politics and eventually, the White House.

In 1848, he was elected president of the New York State Agricultural Society. He was one of the original founders of the Buffalo Historical Society, as well as Forest Lawn Cemetery. Allen was also a proponent of trees on public streets. Allen, along with his wife and children, is buried at Forest Lawn Cemetery in Buffalo, New York.

== Legacy ==
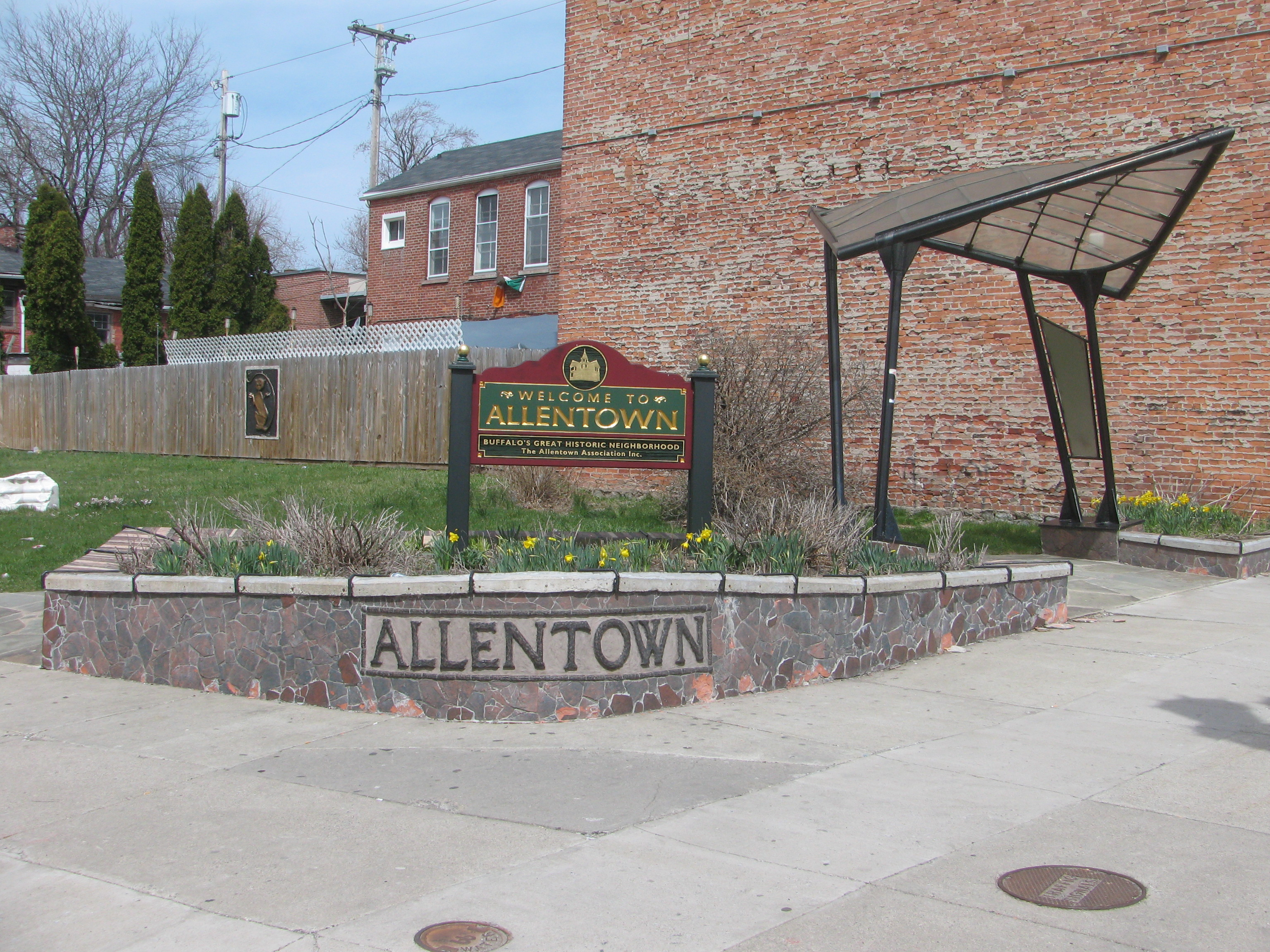
Present day "Allentown" in Buffalo

Allen Street and Allentown in Buffalo are named after Allen. The Allen summer home on Grand Island, "River Lea" (c. 1849), a gracious Italianate built for Allen, is now part of Beaver Island State Park and home to the Grand Island Historical Society.

=== Books ===
Allen wrote many books including:

- The American Short-Horn Herd Book (1846–1883), which registered the various short-horn cattles. He continued it through 1883 with 24 volumes that recorded 125,000 animals in its pages.
- Rural Architecture: Being a Complete Description of Farm Houses, Cottages, and Out Buildings (1852), written during his correspondence with Andrew Jackson Downing.
- American Cattle: Their History, Breeding and Management. (1868)

New York State Assembly
Preceded by Squire S. Case	Member of the New York State Assembly; 1838	Succeeded by Truman Cary
