= Allentown Historic District =

Allentown Historic District may refer to one of two places in the United States:

- Allentown Historic District (Allentown, New Jersey), listed on the NRHP in New Jersey
- Allentown Historic District (Buffalo, New York), listed on the NRHP in New York
