= Grandyle Village, New York =

- Census-designated place
- Location in Erie County and the state of New York.
- Coordinates: 42°59′47″N 78°57′18″W
- Country: United States
- State: New York
- County: Erie
- Town: Grand Island

Area
  - Total: 2.25 sq mi (5.83 km^{2})
  - Land: 1.88 sq mi (4.87 km^{2})
  - Water: 0.37 sq mi (0.96 km^{2})
- Elevation: 596 ft (182 m)

Population (2020)
  - Total: 4,805
  - Density: 2,554.4/sq mi (986.26/km^{2})
- Time zone: UTC-5 (Eastern (EST))
  - Summer (DST): UTC-4 (EDT)
- ZIP Code: 14072 (Grand Island)
- Area code: 716
- FIPS code: 36-29894
- GNIS feature ID: 0951492

Grandyle Village is a hamlet and census-designated place (CDP) in the town of Grand Island in Erie County, New York, United States. As of the 2020 census, Grandyle Village had a population of 4,805.

Grandyle Village is part of the Buffalo-Niagara Falls metropolitan area.

== Geography ==
Grandyle Village is located at 42°59′47″N 78°57′13″W (42.99636, -78.95436) on the eastern shore of Grand Island along the Niagara River. Interstate 190 forms the northeastern edge of the CDP, which extends south along the Niagara River as far as Beaver Island State Park. The Beaver Island Parkway forms the main north-south road through the community.

According to the United States Census Bureau, the CDP has a total area of 1.9 square miles (4.9 km^{2}), all land.

== Demographics ==
Historical population
Census	Pop.	Note	%±
2010	4,629		—
2020	4,805		3.8%
U.S. Decennial Census

=== 2020 census ===
As of the 2020 census, Grandyle Village had a population of 4,805. The median age was 42.4 years. 22.0% of residents were under the age of 18 and 19.0% of residents were 65 years of age or older. For every 100 females there were 95.2 males, and for every 100 females age 18 and over there were 95.1 males age 18 and over.

99.0% of residents lived in urban areas, while 1.0% lived in rural areas.

There were 1,910 households in Grandyle Village, of which 28.3% had children under the age of 18 living in them. Of all households, 54.6% were married-couple households, 15.4% were households with a male householder and no spouse or partner present, and 23.1% were households with a female householder and no spouse or partner present. About 23.8% of all households were made up of individuals and 9.8% had someone living alone who was 65 years of age or older.

There were 1,994 housing units, of which 4.2% were vacant. The homeowner vacancy rate was 1.2% and the rental vacancy rate was 6.4%.

Racial composition as of the 2020 census
Race	Number	Percent
White	4,297	89.4%
Black or African American	91	1.9%
American Indian and Alaska Native	29	0.6%
Asian	105	2.2%
Native Hawaiian and Other Pacific Islander	0	0.0%
Some other race	39	0.8%
Two or more races	244	5.1%
Hispanic or Latino (of any race)	165	3.4%
