= The Buffalo Enquirer =

- Type: Daily newspaper
- Format: Broadsheet; tabloid (later)
- Owner: William J. Conners
- Founder(s): George Rehbaum; William B. Held
- Publisher: William J. Conners Jr.
- Founded: 1891
- Ceased publication: June 19, 1926 (succeeded by the Buffalo Courier and Buffalo Morning Express)
- Headquarters: Buffalo, New York, U.S.

The Buffalo Enquirer was a daily newspaper published in Buffalo, New York, from 1891 until the mid-1920s. It was subsequently published as the Buffalo Daily Star and the Enquirer, commonly known as the Star and Enquirer, until 1926.

== History ==
The Buffalo Enquirer was co-founded by George Rehbaum and William B. Held. Established in 1891, the paper was originally published from 509 Main St. in Buffalo. In the autumn of 1892, Buffalo newspaperman William J. Conners and businessman E. G. S. Miller jointly purchased an interest in the paper, with Rehbaum and Held retaining shares. Charles J. Kingsley became managing editor at that time.

Conners acquired control of the newspaper in the mid-1890s. The newspaper subsequently relocated to 250 Main St.

Conners also became involved with several other Buffalo newspapers. He established the Morning Enquirer, which became the Buffalo Record, and in 1897 acquired the Buffalo Courier. The Record was combined with the Courier as the Courier-Record, later shortened to the Buffalo Courier. The original Buffalo Enquirer, however, continued to be published separately.

In 1919, Conners transferred his newspaper interests to his son, William J. Conners Jr., who became publisher of the Enquirer. By 1924, the Enquirer had been converted into a tabloid and renamed the Buffalo Daily Star and the Enquirer, also referred to as the Star and Enquirer and the Daily Star. Editor & Publisher later described the change as Conners having replaced the Buffalo Enquirer with a tabloid bearing the name Star.

In June 1926, the Conners-owned Buffalo Courier merged with the Buffalo Morning Express. The first combined issue, published as the Buffalo Courier and Buffalo Morning Express, appeared on June 14. The Star and Enquirer initially continued as a separate publication following that merger. Its final issue was published on June 19, 1926. The New York State Library lists the Buffalo Courier and Buffalo Morning Express as its successor. That newspaper was shortly thereafter renamed the Buffalo Courier-Express.
