= Buffalo Courier-Express =

Newspaper in Buffalo, New York

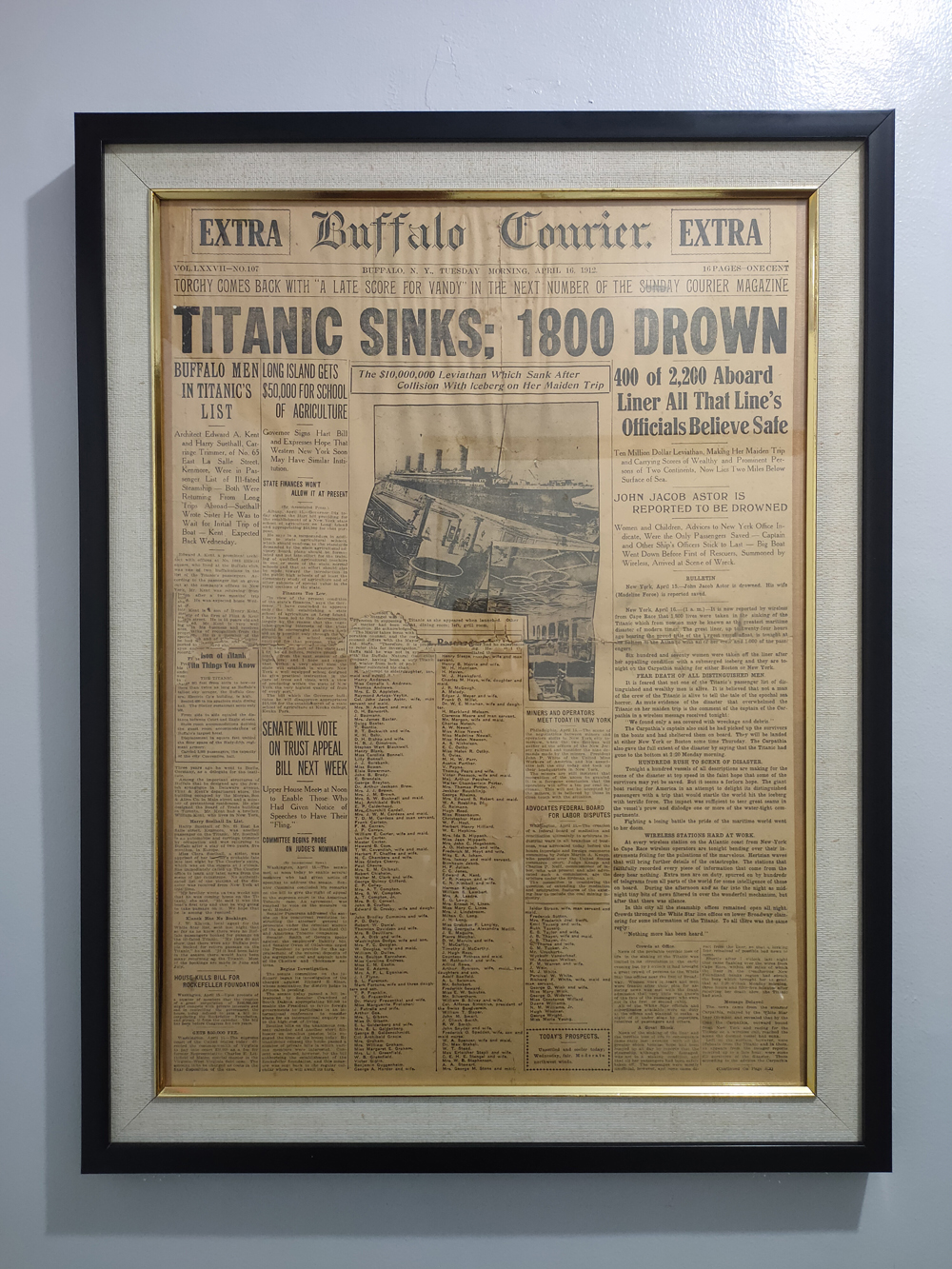
- Front page of the Buffalo Courier on April 16, 1912, reporting the sinking of the RMS Titanic
- Type: Daily newspaper
- Format: Broadsheet
- Owner(s): Conners family (1926–1979); Cowles Media Company (1979–1982)
- Founded: 1926
- Ceased publication: September 19, 1982
- Headquarters: Buffalo, New York

The Buffalo Courier-Express was a morning newspaper published in Buffalo, New York, from 1926 until September 19, 1982. It was formed through the merger of the Buffalo Courier and the Buffalo Morning Express and incorporated the lineage of several earlier Buffalo newspapers.

== History ==
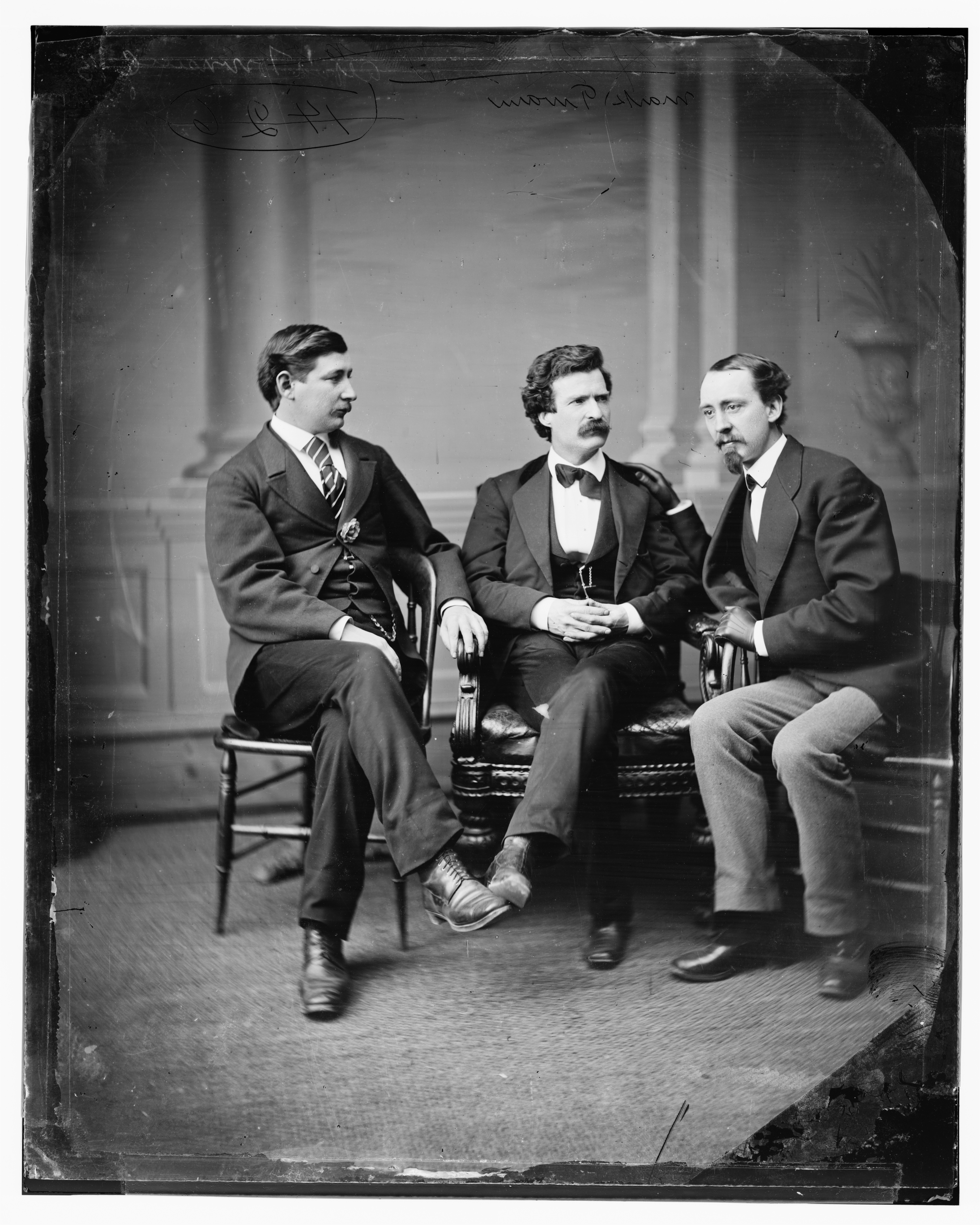
Samuel Clemens (center) with American Civil War correspondent and author George Alfred Townsend and David Gray, editor of the Buffalo Courier

=== Predecessors and formation ===
The Courier-Express was formed in 1926 through the merger of the Buffalo Courier and the Buffalo Morning Express. William J. Conners, owner of the Courier, was instrumental in bringing the two newspapers together. Through its predecessor newspapers, the Courier-Express traced its history to 1828.

The Buffalo Courier itself had resulted from earlier consolidations. The Buffalo Daily Courier, published under that title from 1846 to 1888, was succeeded by the Buffalo Courier, which also incorporated the Buffalo Record. Conners had acquired the Courier in 1897 and combined it with the Record, initially publishing the resulting newspaper as the Courier-Record before shortening the name to Buffalo Courier.

The Morning Express was descended from another line of Buffalo newspapers. One notable part-owner and editor of the Buffalo Express was Samuel Langhorne Clemens, better known as Mark Twain, who acquired an interest in the newspaper in 1869. His association with the Express lasted from 1869 to 1871.

The merger took effect on June 14, 1926, with the publication of the Buffalo Courier and Buffalo Morning Express. The title was soon shortened to Buffalo Courier-Express.

Another Conners newspaper, the Buffalo Daily Star and the Enquirer, continued briefly after the Courier–Express merger. The Star and Enquirer, which had succeeded The Buffalo Enquirer, published its final issue on June 19, 1926. The New York State Library identifies the Buffalo Courier and Buffalo Morning Express as its successor.

At the creation of the combined newspaper, Conners Sr. served as chairman, his son William J. Conners Jr. as publisher and president, and Burrows Matthews as editor.

=== Cowles ownership and closure ===
The Courier-Express remained under the ownership of the Conners family until 1979. In August of that year, it was sold to the Minneapolis Star and Tribune Company, later known as Cowles Media Company.

The newspaper competed with the afternoon Buffalo Evening News. During the 1970s the Courier-Express published a morning edition six days a week as well as a Sunday newspaper, while the News had substantially larger weekday circulation. The two newspapers became involved in an antitrust dispute after the News began publishing a Sunday edition in 1977.

By 1982 the Courier-Express was sustaining significant financial losses. On September 8, Cowles announced that publication would cease on September 19 unless a buyer could be found. Rupert Murdoch's News America Publishing made an offer to acquire the newspaper, conditional on substantial reductions in staffing and changes to union agreements. Negotiations with the newspaper's unions failed to produce an agreement before the deadline.

The final edition of the Courier-Express was published on September 19, 1982. Its closure left the Buffalo Evening News as Buffalo's only major daily newspaper. The Evening News began a morning edition following the closure and was renamed The Buffalo News in October 1982.

=== Archives ===
Following the newspaper's closure, Cowles donated its library and archival materials to the Buffalo and Erie County Historical Society and Buffalo State College. The Buffalo State holdings are housed in the E. H. Butler Library's Archives & Special Collections.

The collection includes approximately one million news clippings and about 100,000 photographs, as well as artwork and framed photographs. The clipping and photograph files principally cover the late 1950s through the newspaper's closure in 1982. The files had served as a reference library for Courier-Express journalists, and older material was periodically discarded by the newspaper's librarians.

Parts of the collection have been digitized by Buffalo State.

== Editors ==
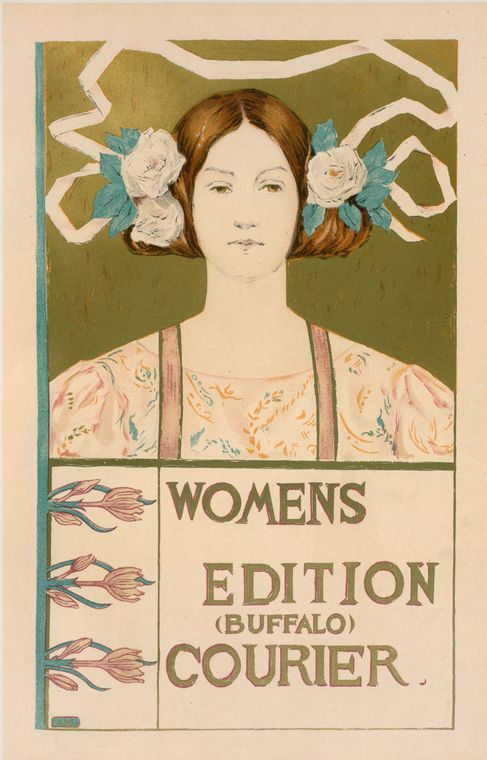
Advertising poster for a Women's Edition, by Alice Russell Glenny

=== Editors of the Buffalo Courier ===
- Douglas A. Levien, 1850s
- David Gray, 1870s

=== Editors of the Buffalo Express ===
- Almon M. Clapp, founder and editor, 1846
- Samuel Langhorne Clemens, 1869–1871, co-editor
- Josephus Nelson Larned, co-editor with Clemens
- James N. Matthews, 1878–1888
- George E. Matthews, 1888–1911
- Burrows Matthews, 1911–1925

=== Editors of the Buffalo Courier-Express ===
- Burrows Matthews, 1926–1955
- Theo C. Meier, 1950s
- Cy B. King, 1956–1970
- Douglas L. Turner, 1971–1980
- Joel R. Kramer, 1981–1982

=== General managers of the Buffalo Courier-Express ===
- Gordon Bennett, 1960s
- Richard C. Lyons, 1971–1974
- Donald J. Maul, 1970s

== Notable alumni ==
- Tom Toles
- Wilbur Porterfield, photographer, 1926–1958

== See also ==
- Buffalo State University
