= Grand Island, New York =

Island town in Erie County, New York, United States

Grand Island, New York French: La Grand Île Seneca: Ga:wé:nö’geh
- Town
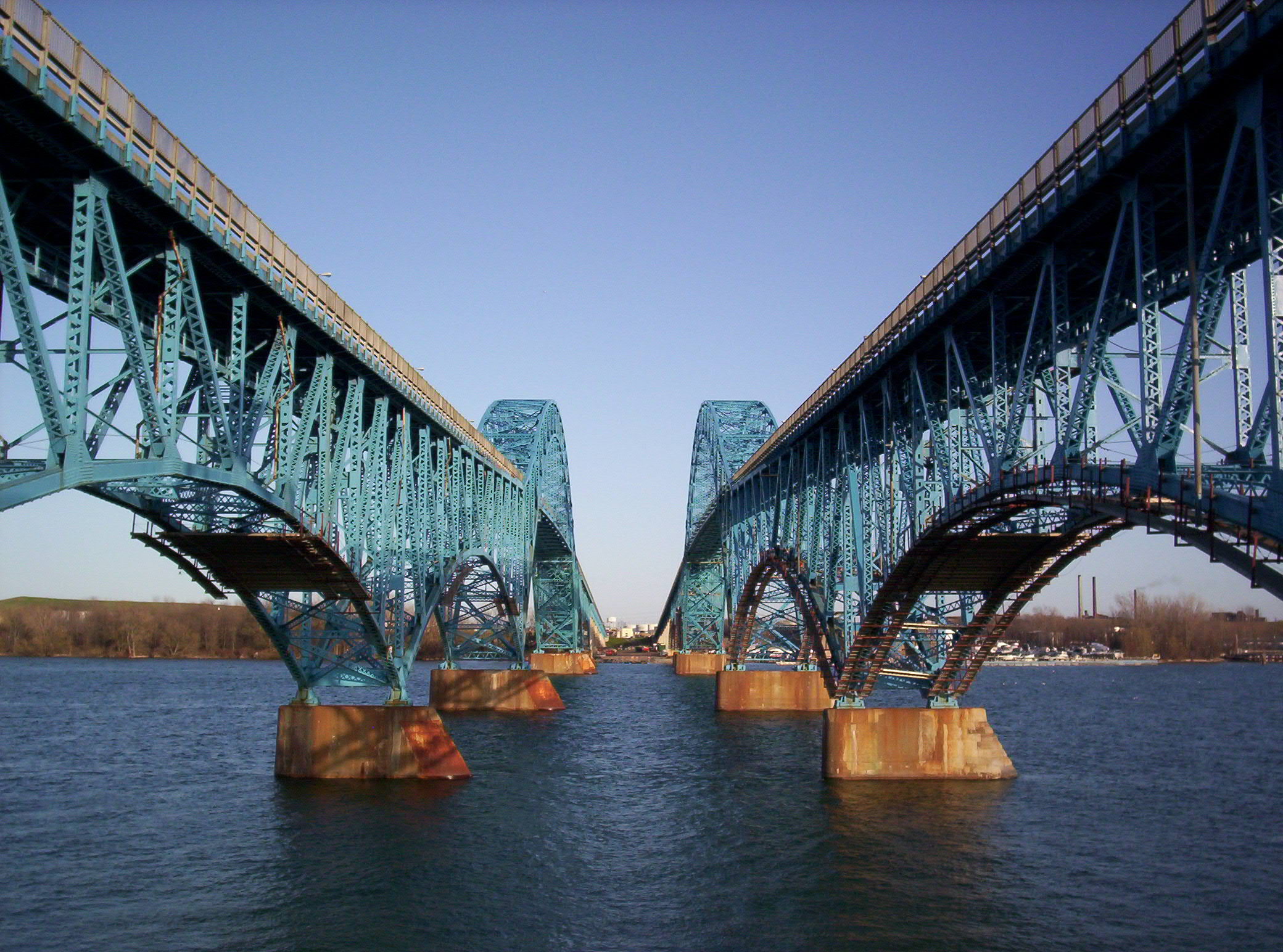
- South Grand Island Bridge

- Flag Seal
- Nickname: La Grande Île
- Motto: "A Grand Place to Live"
- Location in Erie County and New York.

- Location of New York in the United States
- Coordinates: 43°00′43″N 78°57′33″W
- Country: United States
- State: New York
- County: Erie
- Incorporated: 1852

Government
  - Supervisor: Pete Marston (R) Town Council: Peter Marston Jr. (R); Christian Bahleda (R); Tom Digati (R); Michael Madigan (R)

Area
  - Total: 33.29 sq mi (86.23 km^{2})
  - Land: 28.27 sq mi (73.23 km^{2})
  - Water: 5.02 sq mi (13.00 km^{2})
- Elevation: 597 ft (182 m)

Population (2020)
  - Total: 21,389 ▲
  - Density: 736.7/sq mi (284.44/km^{2})
- Time zone: UTC-5 (EST)
  - Summer (DST): UTC-4 (EDT)
- ZIP Code: 14072
- Area code: 716
- FIPS code: 36-029-29828
- FIPS code: 36-29828
- GNIS feature ID: 979012
- Website: grandislandny.us

Grand Island (Seneca: Ga:wé:nö’geh) is an island town in Erie County, New York, United States. As of the 2020 census, the town's population was 21,389 representing an increase of 5.00% from the 2010 census figure. The town's name is derived from the French name La Grande Île; Grand Island is the largest island in the Niagara River and the third largest in New York state. The phrase La Grande Île appears on the town seal.

Grand Island has been home to the Attawandaron Nation and an acquisition of both French and English colonial pursuits. In 1945, Grand Island was part of a plan to make a new World Peace Capital on the international border between Southern Ontario, Canada, and Western New York. The plan proposed placing the United Nations headquarters on adjacent Navy Island (Ontario), which was considered an ideal location because it lay on the boundary between two peaceful countries. An artist's rendering of the World Peace Capital showed the property with bridges spanning both countries (between Grand Island in the United States and the Canadian mainland). The proposal was turned down in favor of the current U.N. headquarters in New York City.

The town of Grand Island is in the northwestern corner of Erie County, and on the Canada–US border, although there is no river crossing to Canada. It is northwest of Buffalo, south of Niagara Falls, and is traversed by Interstate 190 and New York State Route 324.

== History ==
=== Period before the American Revolution ===
In the early historical period of the island, French explorers found members of the Neutral Nation of Native Americans, also known as the Attawandaron, living on the island. By 1651, the nearby Seneca Nation had chased off or killed the Neutrals, having also absorbed some of the survivors. The Seneca then used the island for hunting and fishing, referring to it as Ga:wé:nö’geh. .

In 1764, as part of the Treaty of Cession after the French and Indian War, the island became part of the British colonies in North America.

=== Period after the American Revolution ===
In 1815, New York State purchased Grand Island and other small islands in the Niagara River from the Iroquois nation for $1,000 in hand, and annually a perpetuity of $500 every June. The treaty was signed by Governor Daniel D. Tompkins, Peter B. Porter, Chief Red Jacket, Falling Boards, Twenty Canoes, Sharp Shins, Man Killer, and others. The Senecas reserved the right to hunt fish and fowl on the islands.

In 1824, journalist Mordecai Manuel Noah tried to found a "Jewish homeland on Grand Island." It would be called Ararat, after Mount Ararat, the Biblical resting place of Noah's Ark. However, the idea failed to attract Noah's fellow Jews, and it never got further than a ceremonial laying of a cornerstone. MacArthur Award-winning cartoonist Ben Katchor fictionalized Noah's scheme for Grand Island in his graphic novel The Jew of New York.

The town of Grand Island was organized in 1852 from part of the town of Tonawanda.

On August 25, 1993, the Seneca Nation commenced an action in the United States District Court for the Western District of New York to reclaim land that allegedly was taken from them without the approval of the United States. The Senecas argued the 1815 transaction with New York State violated the Trade and Intercourse Act of 1790, which prohibited Native American lands from being sold without the federal government's consent. The Senecas sought the ejection of more than 2,000 property owners on the island. By decision and order dated June 21, 2002, the trial court held the subject lands were ceded to Great Britain in the 1764 treaties of peace and the subject lands were not owned by the Seneca at the time of the 1794 Treaty of Canandaigua. New York state's purchase of them in 1815 was intended to avoid conflict with the Senecas over land it already owned. This decision was appealed, and the United States Court of Appeals for the Second Circuit affirmed the trial court's decision on September 9, 2004. The Senecas then sought review of this decision by the Supreme Court of the United States, which was denied on June 5, 2006.

== Geography ==
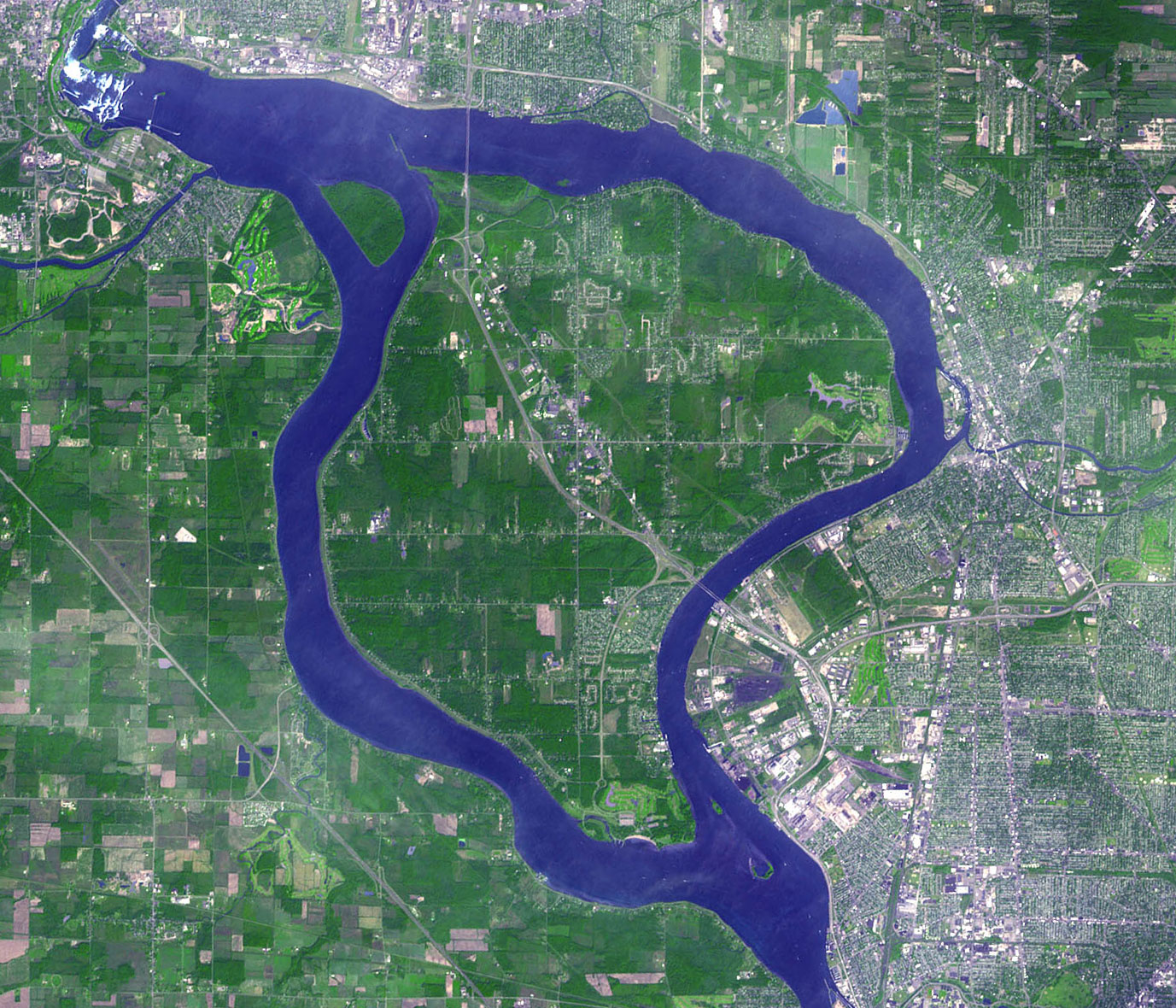
September 2001 satellite image of Grand Island, Niagara Falls is visible at the top left corner.

According to the United States Census Bureau, the town has an area of 33.3 square miles (86.2 km^{2}), of which 28.3 square miles (73.2 km^{2}) is land and 5.0 square miles (13.0 km^{2}), or 15.08%, is water.

The Niagara River splits into two parts at the south end of the island and rejoins at the northwest end, about 3 miles (5 km) upstream (east) of Niagara Falls.

The town lies adjacent to the border between Canada and the United States. As there is no direct bridge or ferry connection from the island to Canada, there are no customs or immigration services. Paired bridges connect the south end of the island to the town of Tonawanda, and another pair of bridges connects the northern end to the city of Niagara Falls in Niagara County. The two sets of bridges carry Interstate 190, a branch of the New York State Thruway (Interstate 90). In addition, New York State Route 324 (Grand Island Boulevard) is conjoined with I-190 at the southern bridges and reaches its western terminus in the northern part of Grand Island.

=== Adjacent cities and towns ===
- Niagara Falls, Regional Municipality of Niagara, Ontario, Canada – west
- Fort Erie, Regional Niagara – southwest
- Town of Tonawanda, Erie County – southeast
- City of Tonawanda, Erie County - east
- City of North Tonawanda, Niagara County – east
- Town of Wheatfield, Niagara County – northeast
- City of Niagara Falls, Niagara County – northwest

=== Major highways ===
- Interstate 190 (Niagara Thruway), crosses the island from north to southeast by the way of the North and South Grand Island Bridges.
- New York State Route 324 (Grand Island Blvd.), east-west highway from its northwest terminus at I-190 southeast through the central part of town, joining I-190 as the route travels east (south) to the town of Tonawanda by the South Grand Island Bridge. (This was the route across town between the single-span bridges that opened in 1935 until I-190 and the second spans were constructed in the 1960s.)
- Beaver Island Parkway (also referred to on maps as South Parkway), north-south parkway from I-190 to Beaver Island State Park. (NYS Reference Route 957B)
- West River Parkway (now closed), former north-south parkway along the western edge of town that parallels the Niagara River. It runs from Beaver Island Parkway in the south, north to Park Road in Buckhorn Island State Park near I-190 and NY 324's northern terminus. The speed limit was 55 mph. (NYS Reference Route 957C). The West River Parkway was closed in the fall of 2017 and converted into a bike path and pedestrian trail in 2018.

== Demographics ==
Historical population
Census	Pop.	Note	%±
1860	954		—
1870	1,126		18.0%
1880	1,156		2.7%
1890	1,048		−9.3%
1900	1,036		−1.1%
1910	914		−11.8%
1920	728		−20.4%
1930	626		−14.0%
1940	1,055		68.5%
1950	3,090		192.9%
1960	9,607		210.9%
1970	13,977		45.5%
1980	16,770		20.0%
1990	17,561		4.7%
2000	18,621		6.0%
2010	20,374		9.4%
2020	21,389		5.0%
U.S. Decennial Census

As of the census of 2000, there were 18,621 people, 6,898 households, and 5,221 families residing in the town. The population density was 653.1 inhabitants per square mile (252.2/km^{2}). There were 7,355 housing units at an average density of 257.9 per square mile (99.6/km^{2}). The town's racial makeup was 95.80% White, 3.17% African American, 0.25% Native American, 1.17% Asian, 0.01% Pacific Islander, 0.25% from other races, and 0.88% from two or more races. Hispanic or Latino of any race were 1.09% of the population.

There were 6,898 households, of which 35.8% had children under the age of 18 living with them, 64.8% were married couples living together, 7.7% had a female householder with no husband present, and 24.3% were non-families. 20.2% of all households were made up of individuals, and 7.9% had someone living alone who was 65 years of age or older. The average household size was 2.68 and the average family size was 3.13.

In the town, the population was spread out, with 26.7% under the age of 18, 6.5% from 18 to 24, 27.7% from 25 to 44, 27.7% from 45 to 64, and 11.3% who were 65 years of age or older. The median age was 39 years. For every 100 females, there were 97.4 males. For every 100 females age 18 and over, there were 94.4 males.

The town's median household income was $60,432, and the median family income was $70,521. Males had a median income of $48,457 versus $30,157 for females. The town's per capita income was $25,816. About 2.4% of families and 3.0% of the population were below the poverty line, including 3.3% of those under age 18 and 5.1% of those age 65 or over.

== Communities and locations on Grand Island ==
- Fairview Court – A hamlet on the southwest shore of the island.
- Falconwood – A hamlet on the southeast shore of the town, named after the Falconwood Club.
- Ferry Village – A hamlet on the border of Beaver Island State Park.
- Grandyle Village – Neighborhood (and census-designated place) located near Beaver Island Parkway and the South Grand Island Bridge.
- Hennepin Road – Road within Grandyle Village named after French explorer Louis Hennepin, who observed and described Niagara Falls in 1677.
- North Grand Island Bridge – Bridge north to the city of Niagara Falls.
- Oakfield – A location north of Beaver Island State Park.
- Sandy Beach – A hamlet in the northeast shore of the island.
- Sheenwater – A location on the west shore of the island.
- Edgewater – A location on the northeast shore of the island.
- Sour Springs Grove – A location by the shore in the southeast part of the town.
- South Grand Island Bridge – Bridge southeast to Tonawanda, a suburb of Buffalo.

== Points of interest ==
- Beaver Island State Park – a state park located at the south end of the island. The park is fully developed for many recreational activities, including a golf course.
- Buckhorn Island State Park – a state park at the north end of Grand Island, noted for its attempts to preserve the local environment.
- Grand Island Nike Base – a town park and senior citizen center, originally a US Army missile site which was part of Project Nike from the mid-1950s through the mid-1960s.
- Grand Island Rod and Gun Club – an outdoor rifle range, trap and skeet range, and archery range. There is also a small pond on the land for fishing.
- Niagara Amusement Park & Splash World – 85-acre amusement park that opened in 1961.
- River Lea Farmhouse – an 1873 Victorian farmhouse once owned by Grover Cleveland's uncle, who hired Cleveland to work on the farm, the future president's first job.
- Spaulding-Sidway Boathouse – listed on the National Register of Historic Places in 1998.
- Veterans Park – a park in the north part of the town, home to many local children's sporting events.
- Woods Creek – a small stream that enters the Niagara River at Buckhorn Island Park.

== Notable people ==
Grover Cleveland, the 22nd and 24th President of the United States, owned a home in Beaver Island.

- William J. Houston, United States Navy NAVSEA 08 Vice Admiral.
- Jimmy Arias, retired tennis player
- Carly Beth, singer-songwriter.
- Bill Boyle, soccer player and coach
- Dale Brown, best-selling military techno-thriller novelist, graduated from Grand Island High School 1974
- Stacy Clark, singer/songwriter; graduated from Grand Island High School 1998
- Grover Cleveland, 22nd and 24th U.S. president, owned a home in Beaver Island
- Charles N. DeGlopper, World War II Medal of Honor recipient, born and raised on Grand Island
- Carlin Hartman, men's assistant coach with the Oklahoma Sooners men's basketball program
- Thom Hatch, award-winning author and historian
- Brett Kern, NFL player for the Tennessee Titans
- Mohamed Abdullahi Mohamed, former President of Somalia
- Mordecai Manuel Noah, American playwright, diplomat, journalist, and utopian who tried to found a Jewish homeland on Grand Island
- Larry Playfair, retired NHL player
- Paul Schenck, Catholic priest
- Rob Schenck, evangelical minister
- Bill Scherrer, retired Major League Baseball player
- Ramblin' Lou Schriver, country musician and radio broadcaster, retired owner of WXRL
- Leonard F. Walentynowicz, former United States Assistant Secretary of State for Security and Consular Affairs

== Schools on Grand Island ==
=== Public schools ===
Public schools are under the jurisdiction of the Grand Island Central School District.

- Grand Island High School
- Veronica E. Connor Middle School
- William M. Kaegebein Elementary School
- Huth Road Elementary School
- Charlotte Sidway Elementary School

=== Parochial schools ===
- St. Stephen School
