= William J. Conners =

American newspaper publisher, businessman, and politician

William James "Fingy" Conners (January 3, 1857 – October 5, 1929) was an American newspaper publisher, businessman, and politician from New York.

== Life ==
Conners was born on January 3, 1857, in Buffalo, New York, the son of Peter Conners and Mary Scanlan. His parents were both immigrants, his father born in Canada and his mother in Ireland.

Conners left public school when he was 13, working as a porter on various steamers that travelled on the Great Lakes between Buffalo and Duluth. He then set up a saloon in Buffalo, which within a few years became successful. In 1885, he made a contract with Washington Bullard to handle all Buffalo freight for the Union Steamboat Co. This was followed by more contracts with other carriers, ultimately acquiring a virtual monopoly of the business in Buffalo and a few other lake ports. By 1898, he had contracts for loading and unloading in Buffalo, Chicago, Milwaukee, and Gladstone, Michigan for all vessels belonging to the transport companies Union Steamboat, Western Transit, Lackawanna, Lehigh Valley, Northern Steamship, Union Transit, and "Soo." In 1895, he handled over 3 million tons of bulk freight and employed around 3,000 men, making him the world's largest contractor in the business.

In 1899, the grain scoopers under Conners' employment began a strike against him and his business practices. The strikers had the support of Bishop of Buffalo James Quigley, William J. Donavan's father Timothy Donavan, and congressman Rowland B. Mahany. The freight handlers later joined the strike, the International Seamen's Union threatened to join as well, and Daniel Keefe, the president of the International Longshoremen's Association, went to Buffalo several times to aid the strikers. After a month, the shipping companies negotiated directly with Bishop Quigley and the new union, effectively cutting Conners out of the grain business.

Conners was president of the Vulcanite Asphalt Paving Company and the Magnus Beck Brewing Company. He also owned a lot of real estate and helped develop property in South Buffalo. In 1895, he purchased The Buffalo Enquirer. In 1896, he established a morning edition of the paper called the Morning Enquirer, renamed to the Buffalo Record in 1897. Later in 1897, he purchased the Buffalo Courier and consolidated it with the Enquirer under the name the Buffalo Courier-Record. The newspaper was later renamed the Buffalo Courier. He continued publishing the paper until 1925, when it turned into a tabloid newspaper called the Daily Star. In 1926, the newspaper was merged with the Buffalo Express and turned into the Buffalo Courier-Express. He transferred the newspaper interests to his son William in 1919.

Conners was initially a Republican. But after he bought the Courier, a Democratic newspaper, he became a Democrat. He became a leader of the Party, and in 1906 he became Chairman of the New York State Democratic Committee, serving as Chairman until 1910. He was the first newspaper publisher to support Woodrow Wilson for President. A personal friend of William Randolph Hearst, he supported Hearst's gubernatorial candidacy in 1922. He was a delegate to the 1908 and 1924 Democratic National Conventions.

Conners found the Great Lakes Transportation Corporation in 1916, following the enactment of a federal statute that prohibited railroad of water transportation. The new corporation took control of all the railroad-owned boats in the Great Lakes, consisting of three passenger steamers and 21 freighters. He installed himself as chairman of the board of directors, and remained actively interested in the corporation even after he was removed from the position. He started to become interested in developing Florida in 1918, when he purchased and reclaimed 7,000 acres of swamp in the Everglades that then produced sugar cane and fruit. In 1924, he built the Conners Highway, which stretched 51 miles across the state and directly linked the Atlantic Ocean with the Gulf of Mexico.

Conners had a large farm in Florida along the shore of Lake Okeechobee that raised thoroughbred cattle and hogs. He entered into a contract with the state of Florida to build the Harding Memorial Bridge across the Kissimmee River, which was built in record time. In 1921, he leased the New York Central car shops in East Buffalo, which were idle during the Depression of 1920–1921. He reopened them under the name W. J. Conners Car Company and soon had them operating at capacity and employing hundreds of men. Interested in spending more time in Florida, he transferred all his northern properties to his son William. In 1925, he set aside a million dollar fund for the William J. Conners Foundation, the proceeds for which went to the poor and needy.

Conners was a Roman Catholic. In 1881, he married Catharine Mahoney of Buffalo. Their children were Peter Newell Mary. Katherine. He then married Mary Alice Jordan of West Seneca in 1893. Their children were Alice, Ruth, and William J. Jr. Mary died in 1924, after which he married Grace I. Hammond. His eldest son Peter died when he was 18, a student at the Michigan Military Academy in Orchard Lake, Michigan, where he was in his third year and had the Academy Corps rank of First Lieutenant and Signal Officer.

Conners died at home from a heart attack on October 5, 1929. He was buried in Holy Cross Cemetery.

Party political offices
Preceded by Cord Meyer	Chairman of the New York State Democratic Committee; 1906–1910	Succeeded by John Alden Dix
