= Allentown, Buffalo =

- Allentown Historic District
- U.S. National Register of Historic Places
- U.S. Historic district
- New York State Register of Historic Places
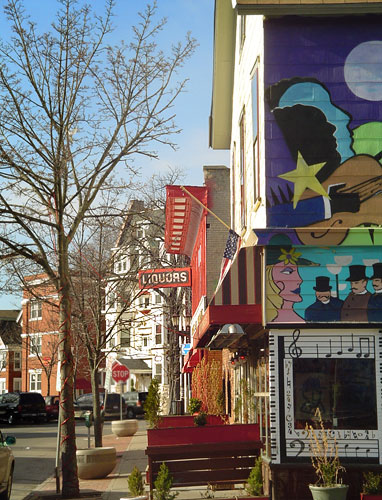
- Allen Street Hardware Cafe, with the Days Park Commons in the background

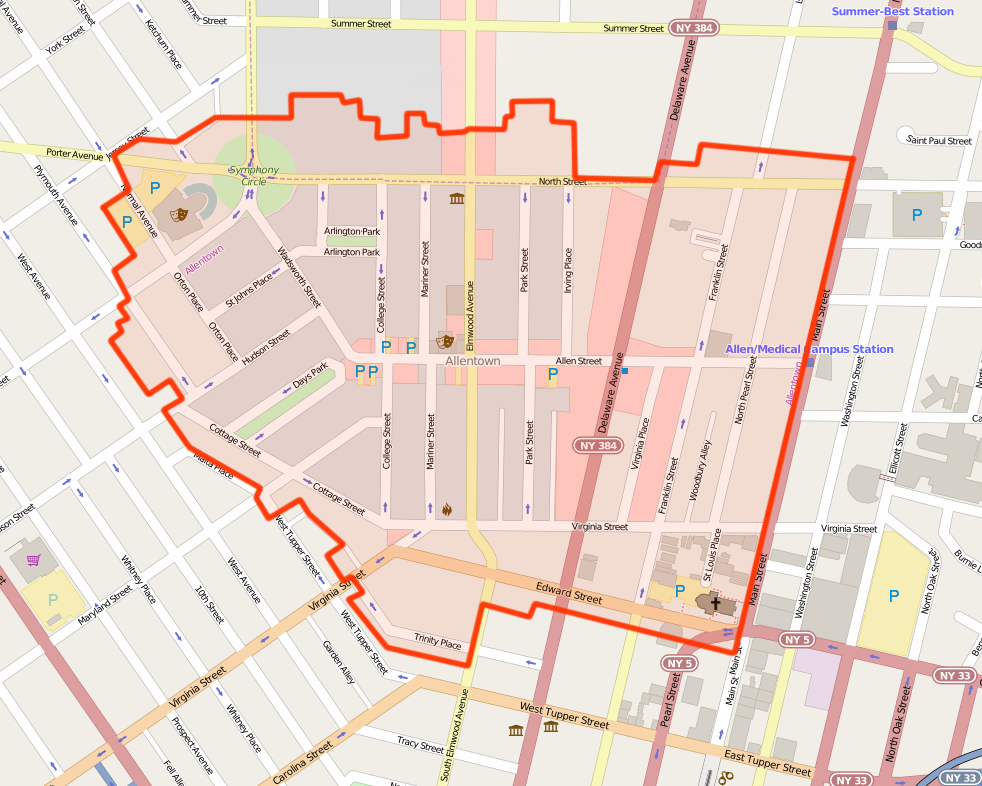
- Allentown Historic District map (2012)
- Location: Buffalo, New York
- Coordinates: 42°53′58″N 78°52′47″W
- Landscape architect: Frederick Law Olmsted, et al.
- Architectural style: Stick/Eastlake, Italianate, Queen Anne
- NRHP reference No.: 80002605

Significant dates
- Added to NRHP: April 21, 1980
- Designated NYSRHP: June 23, 1989

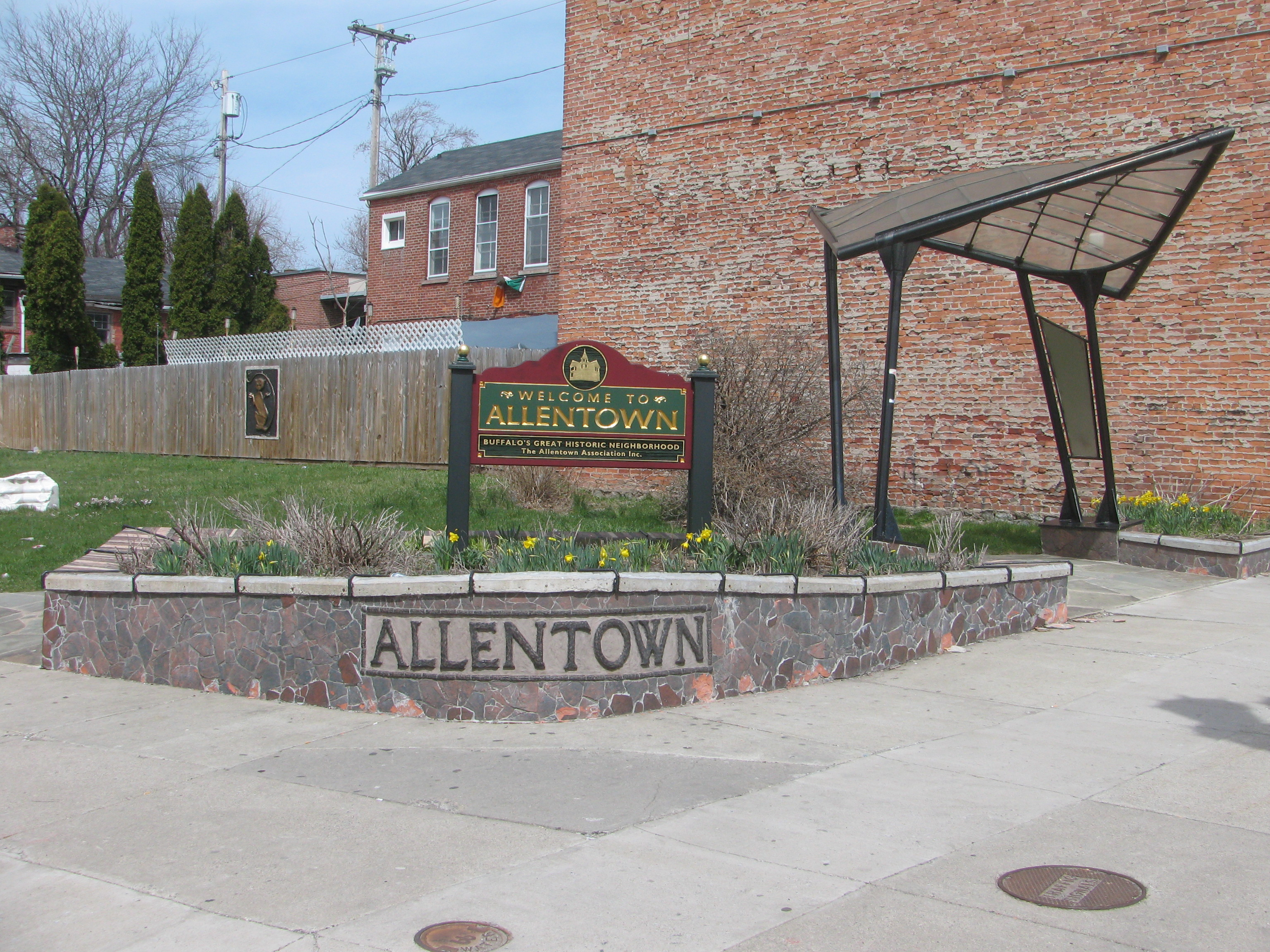
Sign at the corner of Main and Allen streets

The Allentown district is a neighborhood in Buffalo, New York. The neighborhood is home to the Allentown Historic District.

== History ==
Allentown is named after Lewis F. Allen (1800–1890) who came to Buffalo in April 1827 to serve as Corporate Secretary and financial manager of an insurance company. Allen was also a farmer and when looking for space to let his cattle graze, purportedly his neighbor, Thomas Day, suggested some of his land, which sat between the cities of Buffalo and Black Rock. Allen's cattle path became known as Allen Street. Notably, Allen was one of the founders of the Buffalo Historical Society and Forest Lawn Cemetery, where he is buried. Allen was married to Margaret Cleveland Allen, who was the paternal aunt of future president Grover Cleveland. Allen introduced him to many influential people, including the partners in the law firm of Rogers, Bowen, and Rogers, where Cleveland later took a clerkship, which in turn led him to practice law and enter into politics.

== Geography ==
Allentown is the first neighborhood north of the Downtown Buffalo core. It borders the downtown theater and entertainment district to its south, and runs north to North Street at its northern edge, Normal Avenue on the west, and Main street on the east. The neighborhood is generally centered on Allen Street and Elmwood Avenue.

Allentown is known for its community of artists, for its embrace of bohemian, hipster and gay culture, and for the civic commitment of residents to the historic and aesthetic sensibilities of the neighborhood. Allentown is one of Buffalo's premier areas for nightlife, dining, and antique shopping.

== Historic district ==
The Allentown Historic District is a historic district that was listed on the National Register of Historic Places in 1980, and expanded in 2012. It includes the Kleinhans Music Hall which is separately listed on the NRHP and is further designated as a National Historic Landmark. Also listed on the NRHP is the Birge-Horton House on Delaware Avenue.

The original 1980 boundaries include approximately 733 buildings, not including secondary structures. Of these, 6 are Gothic Revival, 125 Italianate, 24 Second Empire, 92 Shingle style, 106 Queen Anne, 15 Stick, 5 Shingle, 56 Colonial and 196 are plain framed buildings.

Three park areas are included in the area, two redesigned by Frederick Law Olmsted and one circle, Symphony Circle, designed by him as part of his master plan for the city's park areas. After he completed the master plan, Olmsted returned to redesign and landscape Day's Park (named after Allen's neighbor Thomas Day who donated his land to the City of Buffalo) and Arlington Park; two existing city parks. In Day's Park he added a circular walkway in front of the school so the students would not trample the grass. The circular sandstone planting area that was in the center of the walkway is still in existence. Arlington Park was home to Frank Lloyd Wright while he worked in Buffalo.

The new boundaries added about 320 properties to the list.

== Notable places ==
- Allendale Theater - home of the Theater of Youth
- Arlington Park - redesigned by Frederick Law Olmsted; home to Frank Lloyd Wright while he worked in Buffalo
- Williams-Butler Mansion - designed by Stanford White
- Day's Park - redesigned by Frederick Law Olmsted
- Kleinhans Music Hall - home to the Buffalo Philharmonic Orchestra
- Symphony Circle - Part of the extensive parks and parkways system designed for Buffalo by Frederick Law Olmsted
- Wilcox Mansion - Theodore Roosevelt Inaugural Site
- The Nickel City Housing Cooperative, Buffalo's first single-family housing cooperative, located in Edward Brodhead Green's historic Granger Mansion.
- Trinity Episcopal Church- Noted for its stained glass architecture.

== Allentown Art Festival ==
The Allentown Art Festival, originally known as the Buffalo Art Festival, is an event started by Jason Natowitz in 1958, beginning as a small town meeting to stimulate business in the neighborhood. The meeting triggered the foundation of the Allentown Village Society, and, by August, plans were in the works for an outdoor art show in the town, which occurred the following month in September 1958. With only 50 artists, the event quickly became very successful. Louis Cherenzia, another one of the founders, noted "It was rated as the most colorful cultural event in Buffalo since the Pan-American Exposition." Following the event, the town recognized its success, and announced plans for a second annual.

"The Buffalo Art Festival" quickly came to be identified with its more precise location, Allentown, and eventually its name became "Allentown Art Festival".

The Allentown Art Festival has grown since its beginnings 50 years ago. Support of the Allentown Village Society, Inc. and its number of volunteers has essentially stayed the same. According to the official website, "Their labors have borne fruit beyond the annual Allentown Art Festival weekend and beyond the boundaries of the Allentown neighborhood of Buffalo."

== See also ==
- National Register of Historic Places listings in Buffalo, New York
- Neighborhoods of Buffalo, New York

== Gallery ==
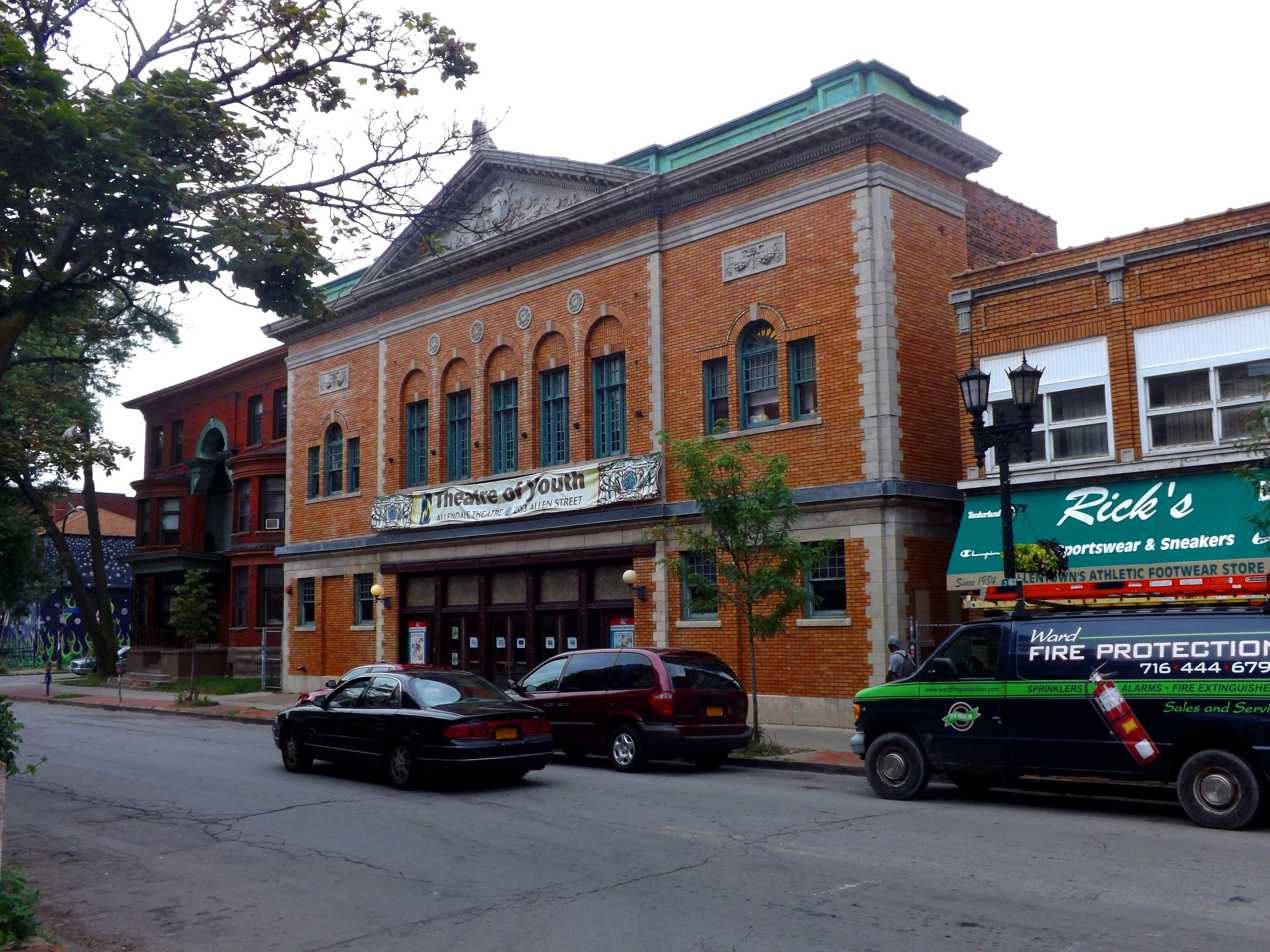
1913 Allendale Theatre

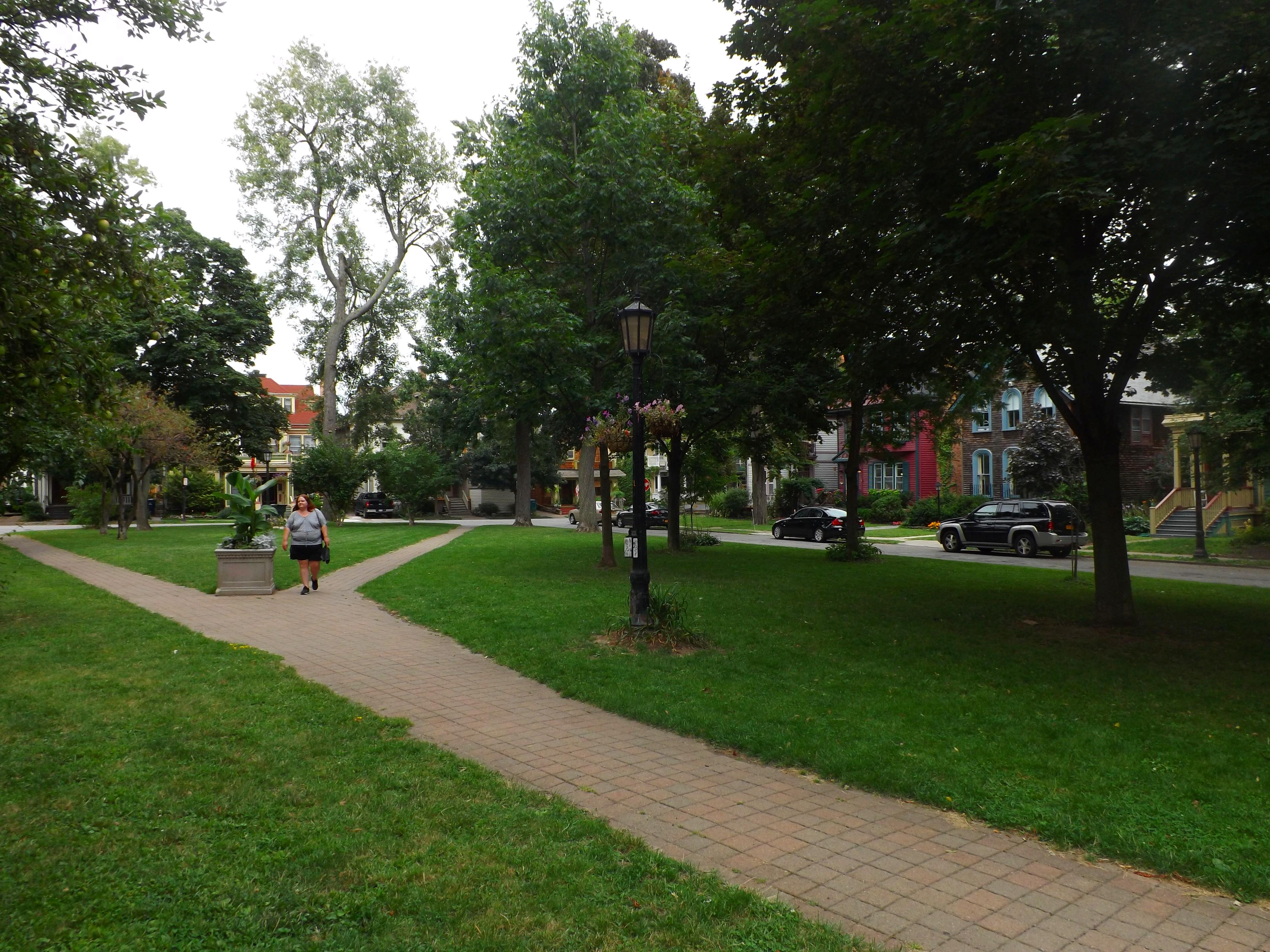
Arlington Park

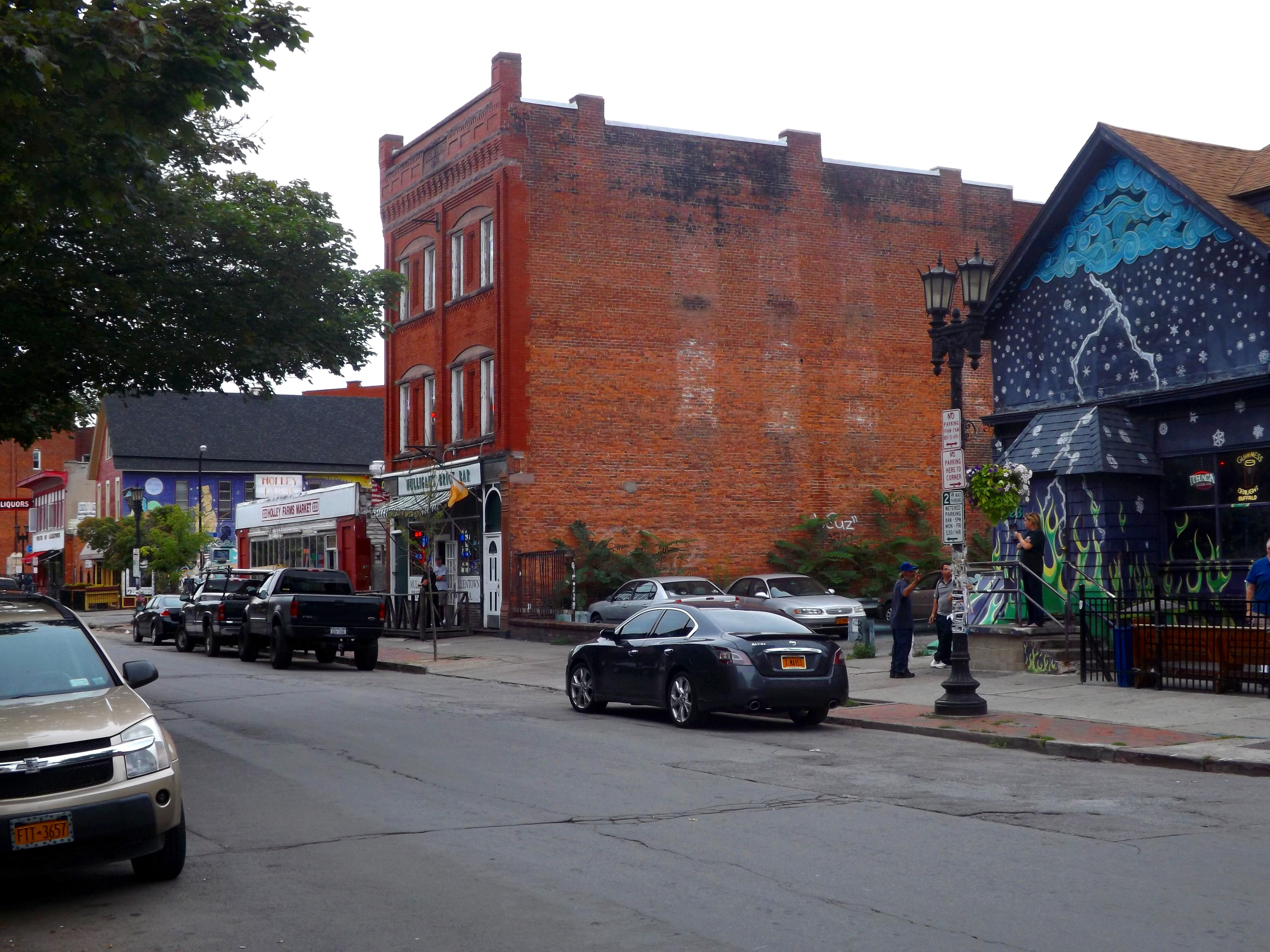
Allen Street bars

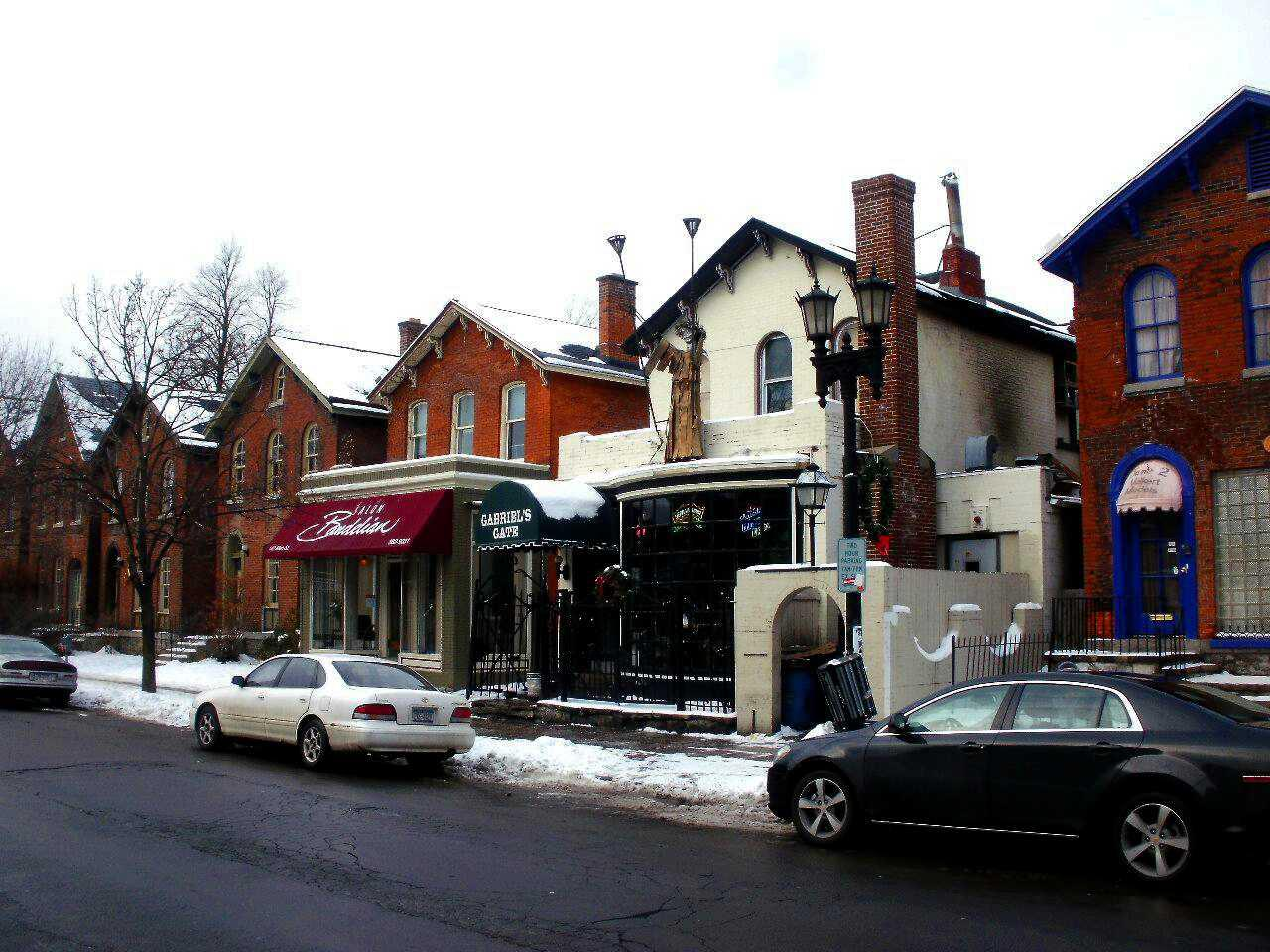
Tiffts Row

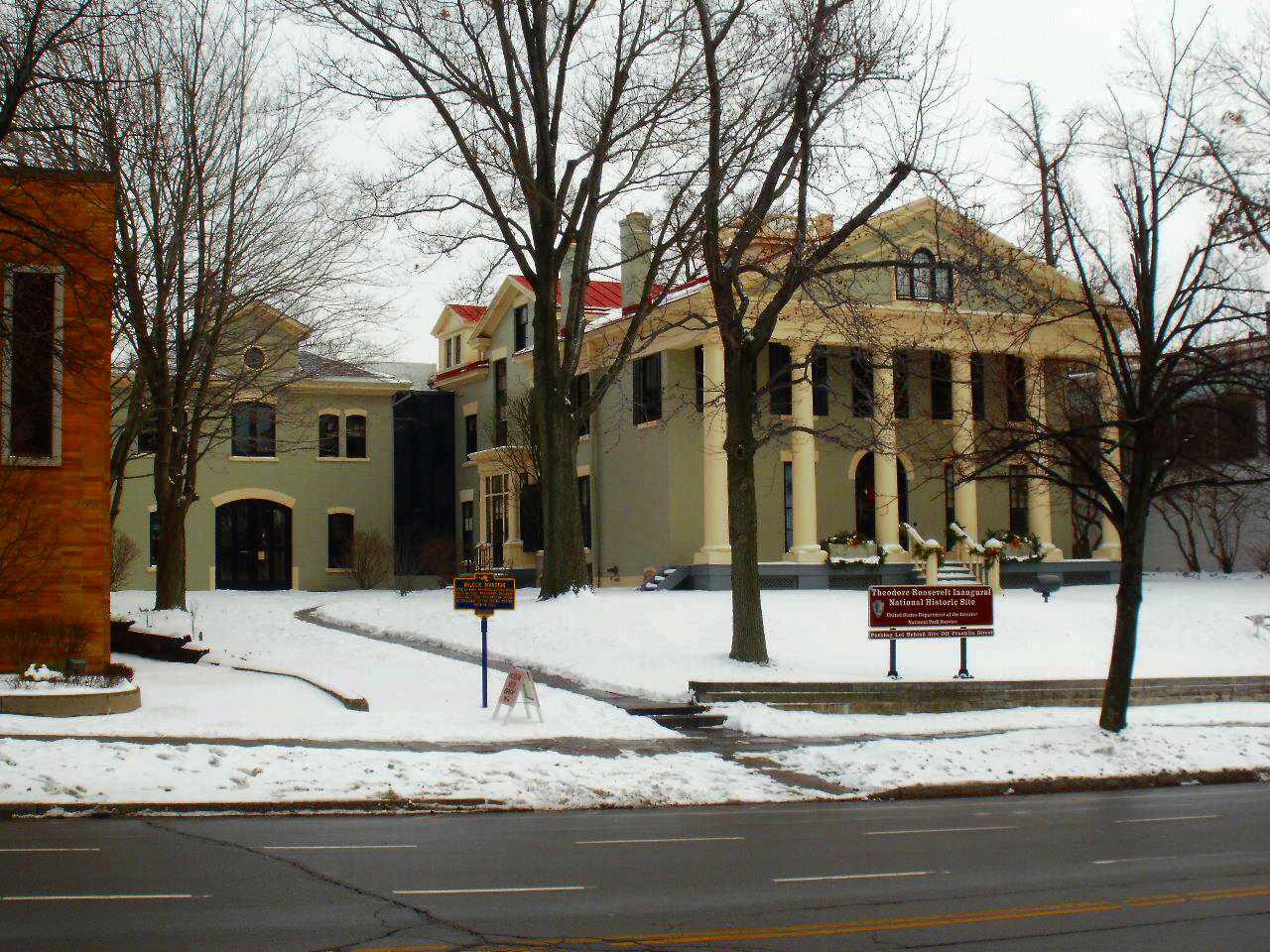
Wilcox Mansion

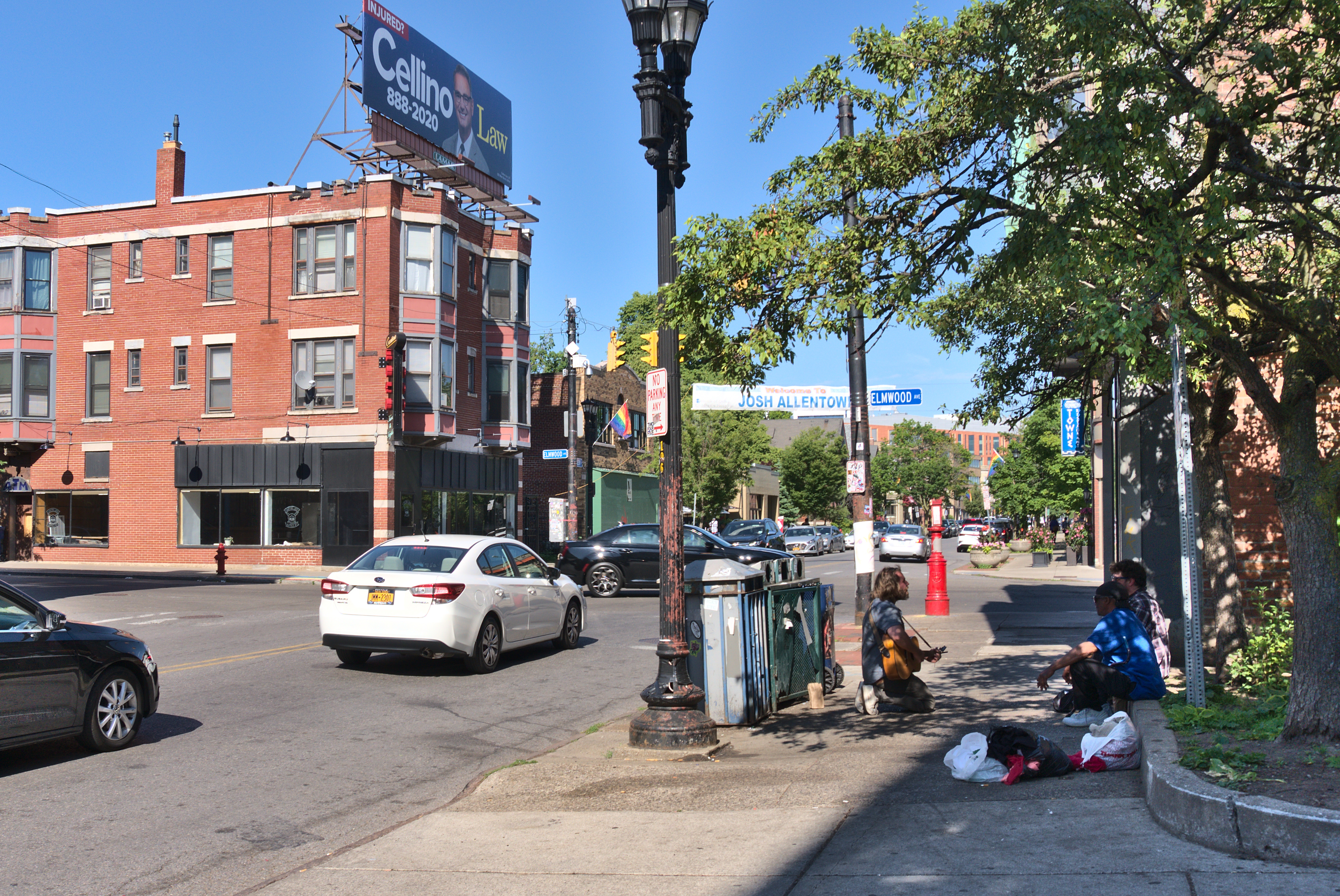
Allen at Elmwood

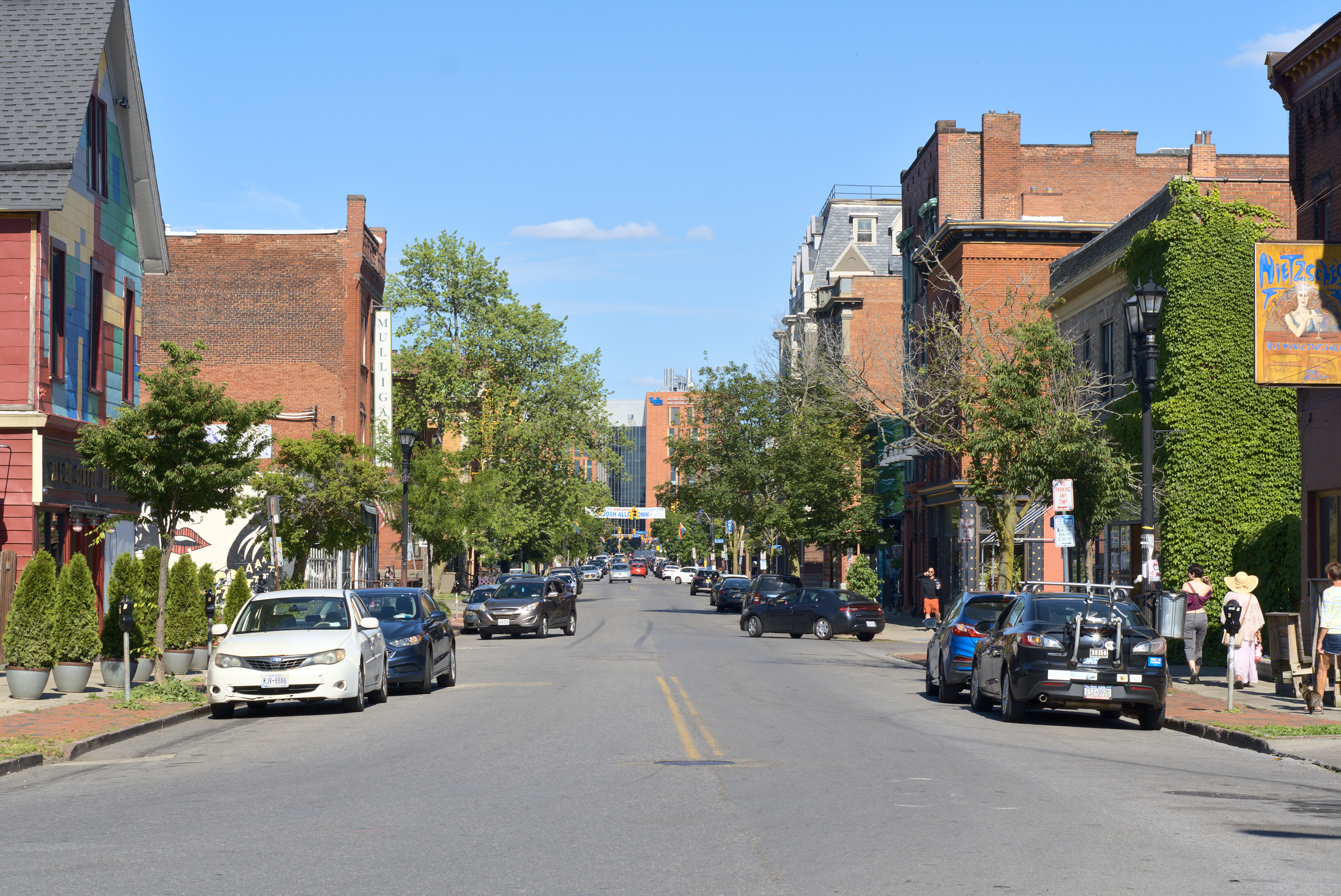
A view of Allen Street from the west end

== Sources ==
- Graff, Henry F. Grover Cleveland (2002). ISBN 0-8050-6923-2, short biography by scholar
