= Caroline test =

International legal principle regarding preemptive war

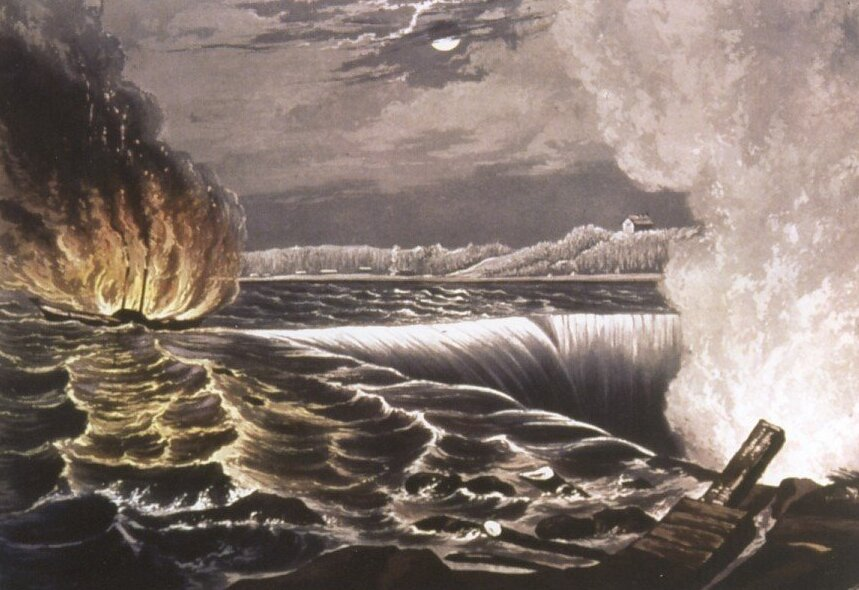
The Caroline affair, which led to the test's creation

The Caroline test is a 19th-century formulation of customary international law—reaffirmed by the Nuremberg Tribunal after World War II—which states that the necessity for preemptive self-defence must be "instant, overwhelming, and leaving no choice of means, and no moment for deliberation." The test takes its name from the Caroline affair.

== Background ==
In 1837, the Upper Canada Rebellion broke out following dissatisfaction with the British colonial administration of Upper Canada. The United States remained officially neutral about the rebellion, but American sympathizers assisted a group of rebels on Navy Island with volunteers and military supplies, which were transported by the steamboat Caroline. In response, a force of Canadian militiamen and law enforcement officials went across the Canada–United States border on the night of December 29 and drove off Caroline's crew before setting the ship on fire and sending it over Niagara Falls. An American watchmaker, Amos Durfee, was allegedly killed by Canadian Sheriff Alexander McLeod during the incident, which became known as the Caroline affair.

Following the ship's destruction, the British ambassador to the United States, Henry Stephen Fox, argued that the attack was an act of self-defence as "Caroline was a hostile vessel engaged in piratical war against her Majesty's people... it was under such circumstances, which it is to be hoped will never recur, that the vessel was attacked by a party of her Majesty's people, captured and destroyed." In a letter to Fox, United States Secretary of State Daniel Webster argues that a self-defence claimant would have to show that the:

necessity of self-defense was instant, overwhelming, leaving no choice of means, and no moment of deliberation..., and that the British force, even supposing the necessity of the moment authorized them to enter the territories of the United States at all, did nothing unreasonable or excessive; since the act, justified by the necessity of self-defense, must be limited by that necessity, and kept clearly within it.

== Requirements ==
The terms "anticipatory self-defence", "preemptive self-defence" and "preemption" traditionally refers to a state's right to strike first in self-defence when faced with imminent attack. In order to justify such an action, the Caroline test has two distinct requirements:

1. The use of force must be necessary because the threat is imminent, and thus pursuing peaceful alternatives is not an option (necessity);
2. The response must be proportionate to the threat (proportionality).

In Webster's original formulation, the necessity criterion is described as "instant, overwhelming, leaving no choice of means, and no moment of deliberation". This has come to be referred to as "instant and overwhelming necessity".

== Significance ==
The principle of self-defence had been acknowledged prior to the Caroline test, but the formulation was notable for setting out specific criteria by which it could be determined whether there had been a legitimate exercise of that right. The test was accepted by the United Kingdom and came to be accepted as part of customary international law.

The threat or use of force is prohibited by customary international law and the UN Charter when it is part of a preventive war waged against the territory of any state. In the Lotus case, the Permanent Court of International Justice decided, "the first and foremost restriction imposed by international law upon a State is that – failing the existence of a permissive rule to the contrary – it may not exercise its power in any form in the territory of another State." The Caroline test was recognized and endorsed by the Nuremberg Tribunal which who adopted the same words used in the test in judging Germany's invasion of Norway and Denmark during World War II.

The right of self-defence is permitted when the conditions of customary international law regarding necessity and proportionality are met. Article 51 of the UN Charter recognizes "the inherent right of individual or collective self-defence if an armed attack occurs against a Member of the United Nations, until the Security Council has taken measures necessary to maintain international peace and security." The Caroline test applies in cases where Article 51 is not a permissive rule because a defensive action was taken before an armed attack occurred.

The Caroline test is considered the customary law standard in determining the legitimacy of self-defence action. In 2008, Thomas Nichols wrote:

Thus the destruction of an insignificant ship in what one scholar has called a 'comic opera affair' in the early 19th century nonetheless led to the establishment of a principle of international life that would govern, at least in theory, the use of force for over 250 years [sic].

== Possible examples ==
The Cuban Missile Crisis, the Six-Day War, and the attack on an Iraqi nuclear reactor are considered the closest situations in which the Caroline test would have been applicable.

== See also ==
- Preemptive war
