= Preemptive war =

Armed conflict to thwart or gain an advantage over imminent invasion or offensive

A preemptive war is a war that is commenced in an attempt to repel or defeat a perceived imminent offensive or invasion, or to gain a strategic advantage in an impending (allegedly unavoidable) war shortly before that attack materializes. It is a war that 'breaks the peace' before an impending attack occurs.

Preemptive war is sometimes confused with preventive war: the difference is that a preventive war is launched to destroy the potential threat of the targeted party, when an attack by that party is not imminent or known to be planned. The U.S. Department of Defense defines a preventive war as an armed conflict "initiated in the belief that military conflict, while not imminent, is inevitable, and that to delay would involve greater risk." A preemptive war is launched in anticipation of immediate aggression by another party. Most contemporary scholarship equates preventive war with aggression, and therefore argues that it is illegitimate. The waging of a preemptive war has less stigma attached than does the waging of a preventive war.

Article 2 (4) of the UN Charter requires that states refrain from the initiation of armed conflict, that is being the first to 'break the peace' unless authorized by the UN Security Council as an enforcement action under Article 42. The UN Charter reads in Article 51 that: "Nothing in the present Charter shall impair the inherent right of individual or collective self-defence if an armed attack occurs against a member of the United Nations." Some scholars believe that the effect of Article 51 is only to preserve this right when an armed attack occurs. Most scholars view the "inherent right of collective or individual self-defense" in Article 51 as including preemptive, or anticipatory, self-defense, as recognized under customary international law and articulated in the Caroline test.

== Theory and practice ==
=== Prior to World War I ===
As early as 1625, Dutch jurist Hugo Grotius characterized a state's right of self-defense to include the right to forestall an attack forcibly. In 1685, the Scottish government conducted a preemptive military strike against Clan Campbell. In December 1837, a legal precedent regarding preemptive wars was established in the Caroline affair, which occurred during the Upper Canada Rebellion. A group of Reformist rebels had established themselves on Navy Island, and American sympathizers had been supplying them with volunteers and military equipment via the steamboat Caroline. On the night of December 29, a force of Canadian militiamen and law enforcement officials went across the Canada–United States border and drove off Caroline's crew before setting the ship on fire and sending it over Niagara Falls. Following the ship's destruction, British ambassador to the United States Henry Stephen Fox argued that the attack was an act of self-defence. In a letter to Fox, United States Secretary of State Daniel Webster argued that a self-defence claimant would have to show that the:

necessity of self-defense was instant, overwhelming, leaving no choice of means, and no moment of deliberation..., and that the British force, even supposing the necessity of the moment authorized them to enter the territories of the United States at all, did nothing unreasonable or excessive; since the act, justified by the necessity of self-defense, must be limited by that necessity, and kept clearly within it.

Webster further wrote that when a nation uses force "within the territory of a power at peace, nothing less than a clear and absolute necessity can afford ground of justification". That formulation is part of the Caroline test, which "is broadly cited as enshrining the appropriate customary law standard."

=== World War I (1914–1918) ===
The Austro-Hungarian Chief of the General Staff, Franz Conrad von Hötzendorf, argued for a preemptive war against Serbia in 1913. There is however no agreement among historians that Conrad's proposals were preemptive and not preventive. According to other historians, Conrad (a social Darwinist) had proposed a preventive war against Serbia more than 20 times before, starting in 1909. Serbia had the image of an aggressive and expansionist power and was seen as a threat to Austria-Hungary in Bosnia and Herzegovina. The assassination of Archduke Franz Ferdinand (June 1914) was used as an excuse for Austria-Hungary to attack Serbia, leading to World War I.

During the course of the destructive and costly World War I, for the first time in history, the concept of "the war to end war" began to be seriously considered. As a further expression of that hope, upon the conclusion of the war, the League of Nations was formed. Its primary aim was to prevent war, as all signatories to the League of Nations Covenant were required to agree to desist from the initiation of all wars, preemptive or otherwise. All of the victorious nations emerging out of World War I eventually signed the agreement, with the notable exception of the United States.

=== League of Nations period (1919–1939) ===
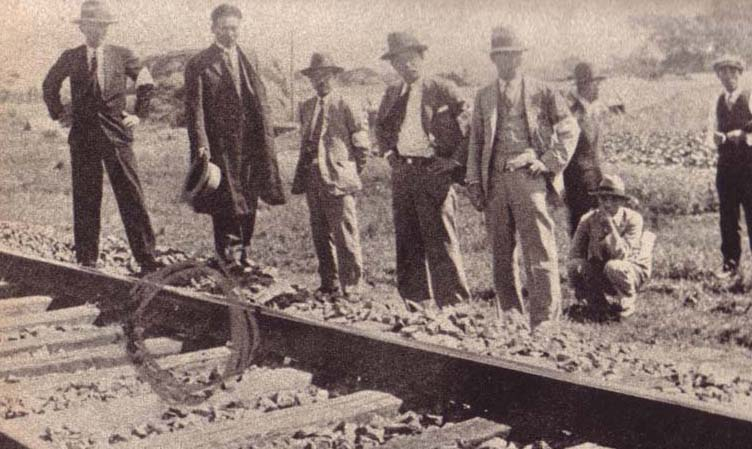
Japanese experts inspect the scene of the "railway sabotage" at Mukden of the South Manchurian Railway.

In the 1920s, the League peaceably settled numerous international disputes and was generally perceived as succeeding in its primary purpose. It was only in the 1930s that its effectiveness in preventing wars began to come into question. Such questions began to arise when it first became apparent in 1931 that it was incapable of halting aggression by Imperial Japan in Manchuria. In the Mukden Incident, Japan claimed to be fighting a "defensive war" in Manchuria, attempting to "preempt" supposedly-aggressive Chinese intentions towards the Japanese. According to the Japanese, the Republic of China had started the war by blowing up a South Manchurian Railway line near Mukden and that since the Chinese were the aggressors, the Japanese were merely "defending themselves."' A predominance of evidence has since indicated that the railway had actually been blown up by Japanese operatives.

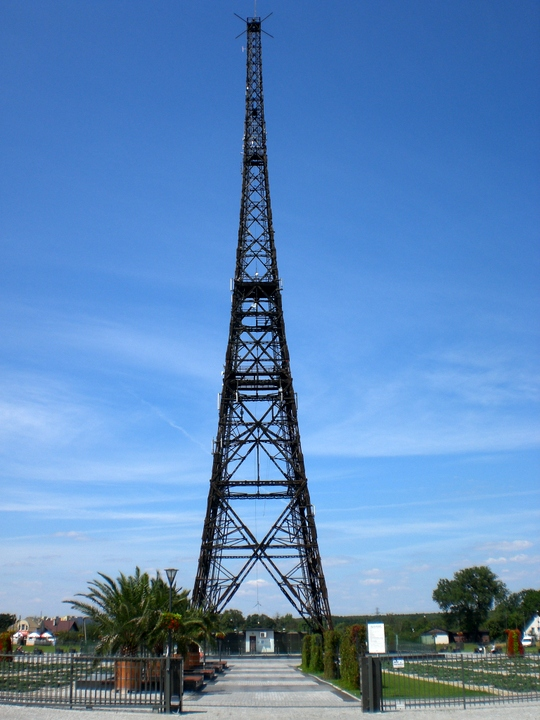
Gliwice Radio Tower today. It was the scene of the Gleiwitz incident in September 1939

In 1933, the impotency of the League became more pronounced when notices were provided by Japan and Nazi Germany that they would be terminating their memberships in the League. Fascist Italy shortly followed suit by exiting the League in 1937. Soon, Italy and Germany also began engaging in militaristic campaigns designed to either enlarge their borders or to expand their sphere of military control, and the League was shown to be powerless to stop them. The perceived impotency of the League was a contributing factor to the full outbreak of World War II in 1939. The start of World War II is generally dated from the event of Germany's invasion of Poland. It is noteworthy that Germany claimed at the time that its invasion of Poland was in fact a "defensive war," as it had allegedly been invaded by a group of Polish saboteurs, signaling a potentially-larger invasion of Germany by Poland that was soon to be under way. Thus, Germany was left with no option but to preemptive invade Poland to halt the alleged Polish plans to invade Germany. It was later discovered that Germany had fabricated the evidence for the alleged Polish saboteurs as a part of the Gleiwitz incident.

=== World War II (1939–1945) ===
Once again, during the course of the even more widespread and lethal World War II, the hope of somehow definitively ending all war, including preemptive war, was seriously discussed. That dialogue ultimately resulted in the establishment of the successor organization to the League, the United Nations (UN). As with the League, the primary aim and hope of the UN was to prevent all wars, including preemptive wars. Unlike the League, the UN had the United States as a member.

In analyzing the many components of World War II, which one might consider as separate individual wars, the various attacks on previously-neutral countries, and the attacks against Iran and Norway might be considered to have been preemptive wars.

As for the 1940 German invasion of Norway, during the 1946 Nuremberg trials, the German defense argued that Germany had been "compelled to attack Norway by the need to forestall an Allied invasion and that her action was therefore preemptive." The German defence referred to Plan R 4 and its predecessors. Norway was vital to Germany as a transport route for iron ore from Sweden, a supply that Britain was determined to stop. One adopted British plan was to go through Norway and occupy cities in Sweden. An Allied invasion was ordered on March 12, and the Germans intercepted radio traffic setting March 14 as deadline for the preparation. Peace in Finland interrupted the Allied plans, but Hitler became rightly convinced that the Allies would try again and ordered Operation Weserübung.

The new Allied plans were Wilfred and Plan R 4 to provoke a German reaction by laying mines in Norwegian waters, and once Germany showed signs of taking action, Allied forces would occupy Narvik, Trondheim and Bergen and launch a raid on Stavanger to destroy Sola airfield. However, "the mines were not laid until the morning of 8 April, by which time the German ships were advancing up the Norwegian coast." However, the Nuremberg trials determined that no Allied invasion was imminent and therefore rejected Germany's argument of being entitled to attack Norway.

In August 1941, Soviet and British forces jointly invaded Iran with the aim of preempting an Axis coup.

=== Six Day War (1967) ===
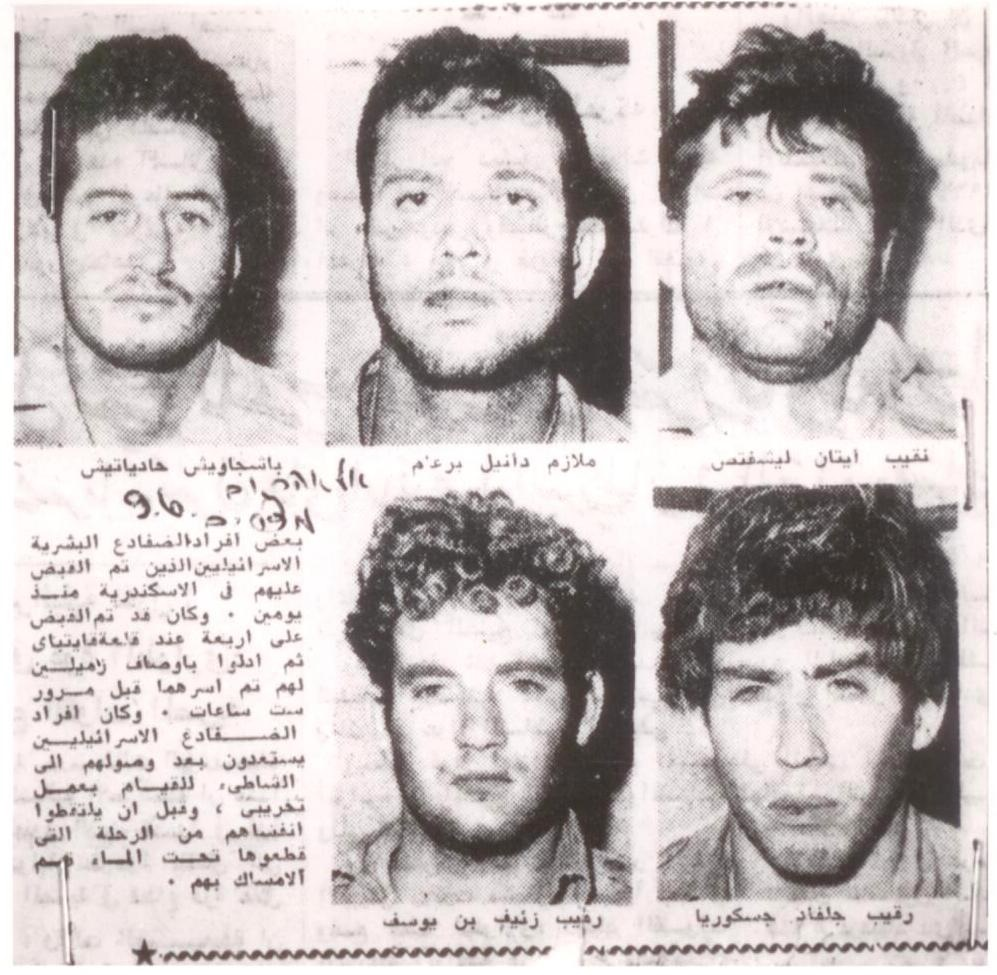
Captured Israeli naval commandos near Alexandria

Israel incorporates preemptive war in its strategic doctrine to maintain a credible deterrent posture, based on its lack of strategic depth. The Six-Day War, which began when Israel launched mass attacks against Egypt on June 5, 1967, has been widely described as a preemptive war and is, according to the United States State Department, "perhaps the most cited example [of preemption]." Others have alternatively referred to it as a preventive war. Some have referred to the war as an act of "interceptive self-defense." According to that view, no single Egyptian step may have qualified as an armed attack, but some perceive Egypt's collective actions as clear that it was bent on an armed attack on Israel. One academic has claimed that Israel's attack was not permissible under the Caroline test; he claims that there was no overwhelming threat to Israel's survival.

=== Invasion of Iraq (2003) ===
The doctrine of preemption gained renewed interest following the American-led invasion of Iraq. The George W. Bush administration claimed that it was necessary to intervene to prevent Saddam Hussein from deploying WMDs. At the time, American decision-makers claimed that Saddam's weapons of mass destruction might be given to militant groups and that the nation's security was at a great risk. Congress passed its joint resolution in October 2002, authorizing the American president to use military force against Saddam's government. However, The Iraq Intelligence Commission confirmed in its 2005 report that no nuclear weapons or biological weapons capability existed. Many critics have questioned the true intention of the administration for invading Iraq, based on possibility of retaliation in the September 11 attacks.

==== Arguments for preemptive war during Bush administration ====
===== Sofaer's four elements =====
The scholar Abraham David Sofaer identified four key elements for justification of preemption:

1. The nature and magnitude of the threat involved;
2. The likelihood that the threat will be realized unless preemptive action is taken;
3. The availability and exhaustion of alternatives to using force;
4. Whether using preemptive force is consistent with the terms and purposes of the UN Charter and other applicable international agreements.

===== Walzer's three elements =====
Professor Mark R. Amstutz, citing Michael Walzer, adopted a similar but slightly-varied set of criteria and noted three factors to evaluate the justification of a preemptive strike.

1. The existence of an intention to injure;
2. The undertaking of military preparations that increase the level of danger; and
3. The need to act immediately because of a higher degree of risk.

===== Counter proliferation self-help paradigm =====
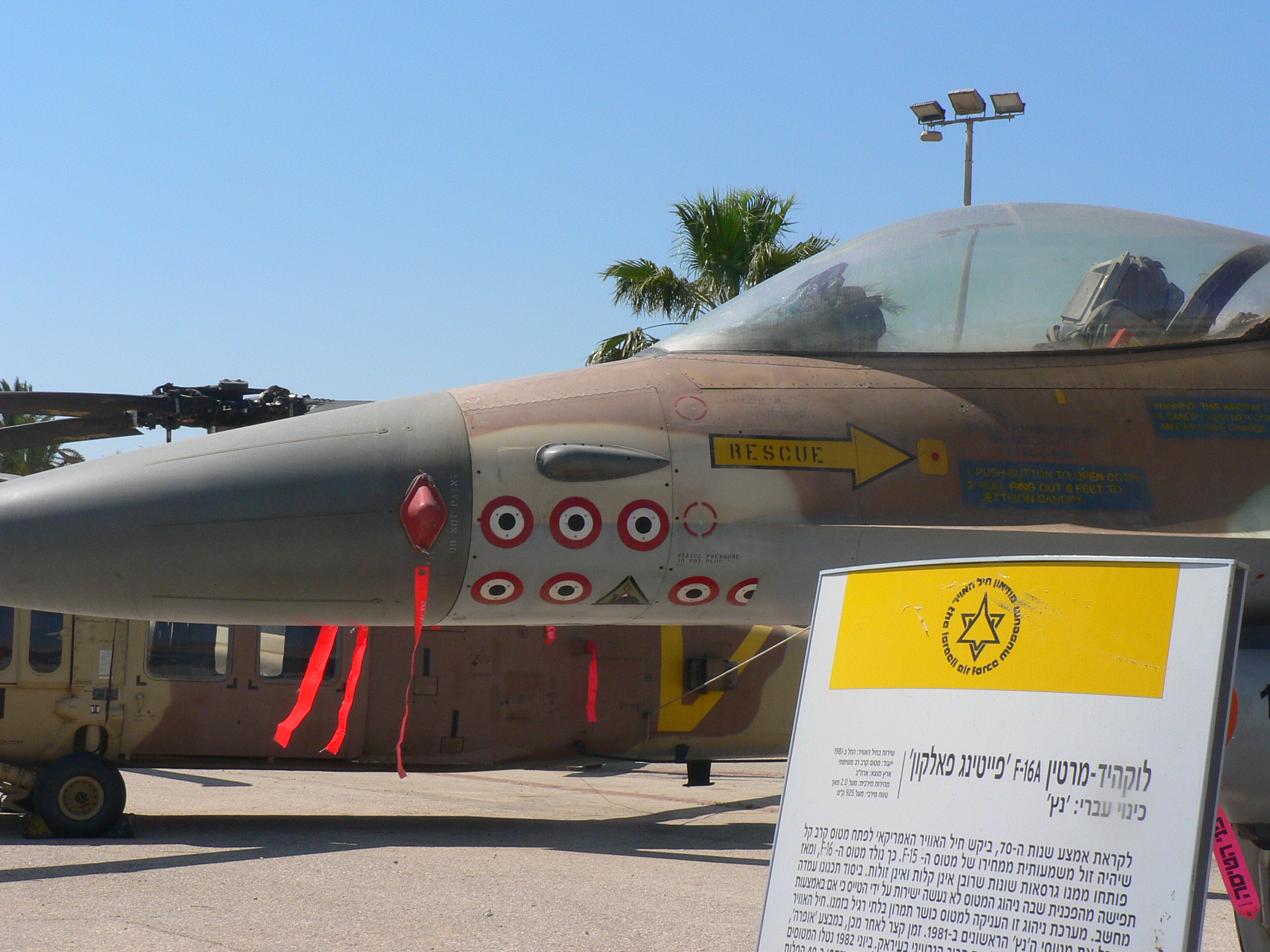
Israeli Air Force F-16A Netz 107 with 6.5 aerial victory marks and Osirak bombing mark

The proliferation of weapons of mass destruction by rogue nations gave rise to a certain argument by scholars on preemption. They argued that the threat need not be "imminent" in the classic sense and that the illicit acquisition of the weapons, with their capacity to unleash massive destruction, by rogue states, created the requisite threat to peace and stability as to have justified the use of preemptive force. NATO's Deputy Assistant Secretary General for WMD, Guy Roberts, cited the 1962 Cuban Missile Crisis, the 1998 US attack on a Sudanese pharmaceutical plant, (identified by US intelligence to have been a chemical weapons facility) and the 1981 Israeli attack on Iraq's nuclear facility at Osirak as examples of the counterproliferation self-help paradigm. Regarding the Osirak attack, Roberts noted that at the time, few legal scholars argued in support of the Israeli attack, but he noted further that "subsequent events demonstrated the perspicacity of the Israelis, and some scholars have re-visited that attack arguing that it was justified under anticipatory self-defense." After the US invasion of Iraq in 2003, US forces captured a number of documents detailing conversations that Saddam had with his inner sanctum. The archive of documents and recorded meetings confirm that Saddam Hussein was indeed aiming to strike at Israel. In a 1982 conversation Hussein stated, "Once Iraq walks out victorious, there will not be any Israel." Of Israel's anti-Iraqi endeavors he noted, "Technically, they [the Israelis] are right in all of their attempts to harm Iraq."

==== Post–Bush administration period (2009–present) ====
After the departure of the Bush administration, the Obama administration adopted and continued many policies of the Bush Doctrine.

== Intention ==
The intention with a preemptive strike is to gain the advantage of initiative and to harm the enemy at a moment of minimal protection, for instance, while vulnerable during transport or mobilization.

In his "Rationalist Explanations for War," James Fearon attributes the use of preemptive strikes by rational states to both offensive advantages and commitment problems between states. When a nation possesses a first strike advantage and believes itself to have a high probability of winning a war, there is a narrower de facto bargaining range between it and an opposing country for peaceful settlements. In extreme cases, if the probability of winning minus the probable costs of war is high enough, no self-enforcing peaceful outcome exists. In his discussion of preventative war arising from a commitment problem, Fearon builds an infinite-horizon model expected payoffs from period t on are (pt/(l - δ)) - Ca for state A and ((1 -pt)/(l - δ)) - Cb for state B, where Ca and Cb are costs incurred the respective states and δ is the state discount of the future period payoffs.

The model shows that a peaceful settlement can be reached at any period that both states prefer, but strategic issues arise when there is no credible third-party guaranteer of the two states committing to a peaceful foreign policy. If there is going to be a shift in the military power between states in the future, and no credible restraint is placed on the rising military power not to exploit its future advantage, it is rational for the state with declining military power to use a preventative attack while it has a higher chance of winning the war. Fearon points out that the declining state attacks are caused not by fear of a future attack but because the future peace settlement would be worse for it than in the current period. The lack of trust that leads to a declining power's preemptive strike stems not from uncertainty about intentions of different nations but from "the situation, the structure of preferences and opportunities, that gives one party incentive to renege" on its peaceful cooperation and exploit its increased military potential in the future to win a more profitable peace settlement for itself. Thus, Fearon shows that preemptive military action is taken by nations when there is an unfavorable shift in military potential in the future that leads to a shrinking bargain range for a peaceful settlement in the current period but with no credible commitment by the other party to avoid exploiting its improved military potential in the future.

== Legality ==
Article 2, Section 4 of the UN Charter is generally considered to be jus cogens (literally "compelling law" but in practice "higher international law") and prohibits all UN members from exercising "the threat or use of force against the territorial integrity or political independence of any state". The UN Charter reads in Article 51 that: "Nothing in the present Charter shall impair the inherent right of individual or collective self-defence if an armed attack occurs against a member of the United Nations." Some scholars believe that the effect of Article 51 is only to preserve this right when an armed attack occurs. Most scholars view the "inherent right of collective or individual self-defense" in Article 51 as including preemptive, or anticipatory, self-defense, as recognized under customary international law and articulated in the Caroline test, noted above. (See Self-defence in international law for additional discussion.) To pass as justifiable self-defense under the Caroline test, two conditions apply. First, the actor must believe the threat to be real and imminent, ruling out the pursuit of peaceful alternatives (necessity). Second, the force used must be "proportional to the magnitude and likelihood of the threat" (jus ad bellum proportionality).

== See also ==
- Controversies relating to the Six-Day War
- A Clean Break: A New Strategy for Securing the Realm
- Battleplan (documentary TV series)
- Bush Doctrine
- Caroline affair
- Dwight D. Eisenhower statements on 'preventive war' in WikiQuote
- Jus ad bellum
- War of aggression
- Pre-emptive nuclear strike (counterforce)
- Soviet offensive plans controversy
- Hobbesian trap
- The best defense is a good offense
