= Michael Hoffman (politician) =

American politician (1787–1848)

Michael Hoffman (October 11, 1787 – September 27, 1848) was an American lawyer and politician. He was U.S. Representative from New York from 1825 to 1833

== Personal life ==
Hoffman was born in that part of the Town of Halfmoon which was separated in 1828 to form the Town of Clifton Park. At the time of his birth, the place was in Albany County, New York, but became part of Saratoga County, New York, when this was established in 1791. His father was a German immigrant.

== Education ==
He studied medicine and law. He was admitted to the bar and commenced practice in Herkimer, New York.

== Career ==
He was District Attorney of Herkimer County, New York, from 1823 to 1825.

=== Congress ===
Hoffman was elected as a Jacksonian to the 19th, 20th, 21st and 22nd United States Congresses, holding office from March 4, 1825, to March 3, 1833. He was Chairman of the House Committee on Naval Affairs (21st and 22nd Congress). He was First Judge of the Herkimer County Court from 1830 to 1833.

=== Later career ===
On April 4, 1833, Hoffman was chosen when the State Legislature decided to increase the number of Canal Commissioners from four to five. He resigned on May 6, 1835.

He was Register of the Land Office at Saginaw, Michigan, in 1836 and was appointed to the Board of Regents of the University of Michigan in 1837, but resigned shortly after. Afterwards he returned to Herkimer, NY, and was a member of the New York State Assembly in 1841, 1842 and 1844.

On April 17, 1841, Hoffman urged the Committee of the Judiciary to pass a bill granting Alexander McLeod safe conduct out of the state and the abandonment of criminal charges against him, stating that "if it be true that the local authorities of Canada under the belief that they were imminently endangered by the hostile gathering on Navy Island, did order this expedition", then McLeod did not bear the blame for the death of any killed as a result.

He was a delegate to the New York State Constitutional Convention of 1846.

He was Naval Officer of the Port of New York from May 3, 1845, until his death in office.

== Death ==
Hoffman died on September 27, 1848.

== Sources ==
- United States Congress. "Michael Hoffman (id: H000688)". Biographical Directory of the United States Congress.
- The New York Civil List compiled by Franklin Benjamin Hough (pages 42, 281, 361 and 375; Weed, Parsons and Co., 1858)

U.S. House of Representatives
Preceded by John Herkimer	Member of the U.S. House of Representatives from New York's 15th congressional district 1825–1833	Succeeded by Charles McVean
