= Self-defence in international law =

International law recognizes a right of self-defence according to the Chapter VII, Article 51 of the UN Charter, as the International Court of Justice (ICJ) affirmed in the Nicaragua Case on the use of force. Some commentators believe that the effect of Article 51 is only to preserve this right when an armed attack occurs, and that other acts of self-defence are banned by article 2(4). Another view is that Article 51 acknowledges the previously existing customary international law right and then proceeds to lay down procedures for the specific situation when an armed attack does occur. Under the latter interpretation, the legitimate use of self-defence in situations when an armed attack has not actually occurred is still permitted, as in the Caroline case noted below. Not every act of violence will constitute an armed attack. The ICJ has tried to clarify, in Nicaragua v. United States, what level of force is necessary to qualify as an armed attack.

== Article 51 of the UN Charter ==
Nothing in the present Charter shall impair the inherent right of collective or individual self-defence if an armed attack occurs against a member of the United Nations, until the Security Council has taken the measures necessary to maintain international peace and security. Measures taken by members in exercise of this right of self-defense shall be immediately reported to the Security Council and shall not in any way affect the authority and responsibility of the Security Council under the present Charter to take at any time such action as it deems necessary in order to maintain or restore international peace and security.

— Chapter VII, Article 51 of the UN Charter

== Article 2(4) of the UN Charter ==
All Members shall refrain in their international relations from the threat or use of force against the territorial integrity or political independence of any state, or in any other manner inconsistent with the purposes of the United Nations.

— Chapter I, Article 2(4) of the UN Charter

The drafters' intent was that collective force approved and organized by the Security Council would substitute for unilateral uses of force by states. However, some states were concerned that use of the veto power by one of the Council's permanent members might prevent that body from taking necessary action, and they insisted upon inserting into the Charter an explicit right of self defence.

== Customary international law and Caroline test ==
The traditional customary rules on preemptive self-defence derive from an early diplomatic incident between the United States and the United Kingdom over the killing of a US citizen (a Black American watchmaker named Amos Durfee) who was on board a ship (the Caroline), which was docked in the US but which had been carrying personnel and stores of war to rebels in Canada, then a British colony. The US government had not approved or supported the Caroline's activities and the ship was peacefully at anchor in the US when British forces attacked, burned the ship and sent it over Niagara Falls. The so-called Caroline case established that in order for one state to use force in the territory of another state which had not used force first there had to exist "a necessity of self-defence, instant, overwhelming, leaving no choice of means, and no moment of deliberation,' and furthermore that any action taken must be proportional, "since the act justified by the necessity of self-defence, must be limited by that necessity, and kept clearly within it." These statements by the US Secretary of State to the British authorities are accepted as an accurate description of the customary right of preemptive, or anticipatory, self-defence. They are sometimes mistakenly said to apply to all uses of force by states in self-defence.

== Imminent threat ==
Imminent threat is a standard criterion in international law, developed by Daniel Webster as he litigated the Caroline affair. An imminent threat is "instant, overwhelming, and leaving no choice of means, and no moment for deliberation". This criterion is used in the international law justification of preemptive self-defence: self-defence without being physically attacked first (see Caroline test). This concept has been used to mitigate the lack of definition provided by Article 51 of the Charter of the United Nations, which states that sovereign nations may fend off an armed attack until the Security Council has adopted measures under Chapter VII of the United Nations Charter.

The Caroline affair has been used to establish the principle of "anticipatory self-defence" and is also now invoked frequently in the course of the dispute around preemptive strike (or preemption doctrine).

== Historical ==
Hugo Grotius, the 17th-century jurist and father of public international law, stated in his 1625 magnum opus The Law of War and Peace that "Most Men assign three Just Causes of War, Defence, the Recovery of what's our own, and Punishment."

== See also ==
- Casus belli
- Decolonization
- Jus ad bellum
- Just war theory
- Laws of war
- Preventive war
- Religious war
- Security-related bills
- Targeted killing
- Threat of force (public international law)
- Use of force in international law

Domestic law issues related to self-defence

- Bodily harm and grievous bodily harm
- Castle Doctrine in the United States
- Clear and present danger
- Duty to retreat
- Imminent lawless action
