= Alexander McLeod =

Canadian sheriff

- Born: 17 January 1796
- Died: 27 September 1871
- Occupation: Sheriff
- Spouse: Ellen Morrison
- Conviction: Not Guilty
- Criminal charges: Murder

Alexander McLeod (1796–1871) was a Scottish-Canadian who served as sheriff in Niagara, Ontario. After the Upper Canada Rebellion, he boasted that he had partaken in the 1837 Caroline Affair, the sinking of an American steamboat that had been supplying William Lyon Mackenzie's rebels with arms. Three years later, he was arrested by the United States and charged with the murder of the sailor killed in the attack, but his incarceration infuriated Canada and Great Britain, which demanded his repatriation in the strongest terms; arguing that any action taken against the Caroline had been taken under orders, and the responsibility lay with the Crown, not McLeod himself.

President Martin van Buren ignored the demands for repatriation, leading Lord Palmerston to threaten that a continued refusal to repatriate McLeod would result in "war immediate and frightful in its character, because it would be a war of retaliation and vengeance".

McLeod was tried in a "curious spectacle". He was acquitted on the basis of an alibi that supported his non-participation in the Affair.

== Caroline Affair ==
The steamboat Caroline was a hostile vessel engaged in piratical war against her Majesty's people... it was under such circumstances, which it is to be hoped will never recur, that the vessel was attacked by a party of her Majesty's people, captured and destroyed.

— Henry Stephen Fox, in a letter to John Forsythe, 1841.

During the Upper Canada Rebellion, the American steamer Caroline had been used to ferry weapons to a group of 200-300 Canadian rebels on Navy Island. Her owner, William Wells, had purchased the boat six months earlier after it was seized for smuggling, and claimed to have unloaded a cask for the insurgents but to have been ignorant of its contents. In response to American actions, a force of Canadian militiamen and crossed the Canada-United States border, drove away the crew of Caroline and burnt the vessel. During the confrontation, Amos Durfee, a Black American watchmaker, was killed by an unknown man.

Described as "a man of gentlemanly bearing and demeanor", McLeod was arrested on November 12, 1840, after visiting Lewiston, New York and boasting that "his sword had drank the blood of two men on board the Caroline" three years earlier. He was subsequently charged with the murder of Amos Durfee - an African American sailor found dead near the dock after the boat was destroyed, and held in Lockport Jail. On April 17, Michael Hoffman of the New York State Assembly moved the Committee of the Judiciary to pass a bill granting McLeod safe conduct out of the state and the abandonment of criminal charges against him, stating that "if it be true that the local authorities of Canada under the belief that they were imminently endangered by the hostile gathering on Navy Island, did order this expedition", then McLeod did not bear the blame for the death of any killed as a result. However this was ignored, and a trial date was set for the following October.

== Trial ==
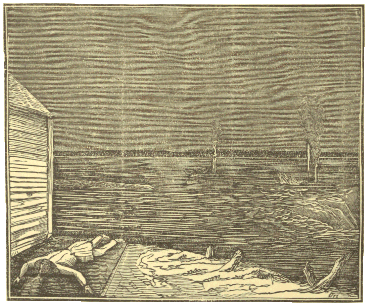
The body of Durfee, illustrated in 1885

McLeod was the subject of a "curious spectacle" of a trial, in that his defence attorney Joshua A. Spencer had been appointed United States Attorney for the Northern District of New York, but chose to remain as McLeod's counsel. Governor William H. Seward wrote to President John Tyler, but was informed that it was up to Spencer how he wished to handle his own affairs.

British ambassador Henry Stephen Fox initially informed the Americans that the legal precedent established in handing over a man named "Christie" three years earlier after his arrest for the Caroline burning would also be applied to McLeod.

The indictment read by District Attorney J. L. Woods against McLeod stated that he had...

"not having the fear of God before his eyes, but being moved and seduced by the instigation of the devil,...with force and arms...on and upon one Amos Durfee, in the peace of God...then and there being, feloniously, wilfully, and in his malice aforethough and with a premeditated design to effect the death of the said Amos Durfee, did then and there make an assault upon the said Durfee...loaded and charged with gunpower and one leaden bullet...did shoot and discharge...with the leaden bullet aforesaid, out of the gun aforesaid, by force of the gunpowder and shot sent forth as aforesaid, the said Amos Durfee, in and upon the back part of the head of him

Further counts of the indictment suggested that John Mosier, Thomas McCormick, Rolland McDonald, or "certain evil-disposed persons to the Jurors unknown" had been the actual gunman to kill Durfee, but that McLeod had been an accessory to the murder. Theodore Stone, the Sheriff of Niagara County, was the subject of penalty for refusing to testify on the prosecutions defence.

Presided over by Judge Gridley, the case saw Charles O. Curtis, Dr. Edmund Allen, John Mott, Elijah Brush, Ira Byington, William Carpenter, Isaih Thurber, Peter Sleight, Asher Allen, Seymour Carrier, Eseck Allen and Volnev Elliott as the chosen jurors, nine of them farmers. Henry Addington of Paris, Ontario pleaded that his religious views forbade him from serving on a jury and was excused.

The key witnesses expected to testify that they recognised McLeod from the attack never materialised, weakening the prosecution's case. Since nobody saw Durfee get shot, the question of which of the Canadians - if indeed it had been a Canadian - had pulled the trigger was the focus the second day's witnesses. Wells, the owner of the Caroline, testified that he did not believe any of his men carried firearms themselves and thus it had to have been one of the attackers who shot Durfee, although a boatman who was traveling on the ship stated that he believed he had seen guns held by crewmen the day before the attack.

The defence attorney tried to press the fact that a musket had been seized from the nearby Field's Tavern which had evidence of being fired that night, and suggested that somebody in the nearby tavern may have taken a shot at the scuffle atop the Caroline and hit Durfee by mistake. One witness suggested that a Captain Keeler had taken the gun and run out into the night, firing the weapon into the air aimlessly. This was contradicted by the owner of the tavern, who said that one of his patrons had taken the gun outside and deliberately fired towards the men taking control of the Caroline, until he persuaded the man that such aggression might cause the attackers to target the tavern.

The jury deliberated only twenty minutes, before returning to find McLeod not guilty, noting his alibi that he had been elsewhere at the time of the attack and had falsely boasted of involvement. The "gentle words" of Lord Ashburton were credited with allowing the acquittal to sink from public scrutiny.

== See also ==
- Caroline Affair
