= Buckhorn Island State Park =

State park in Erie County, New York

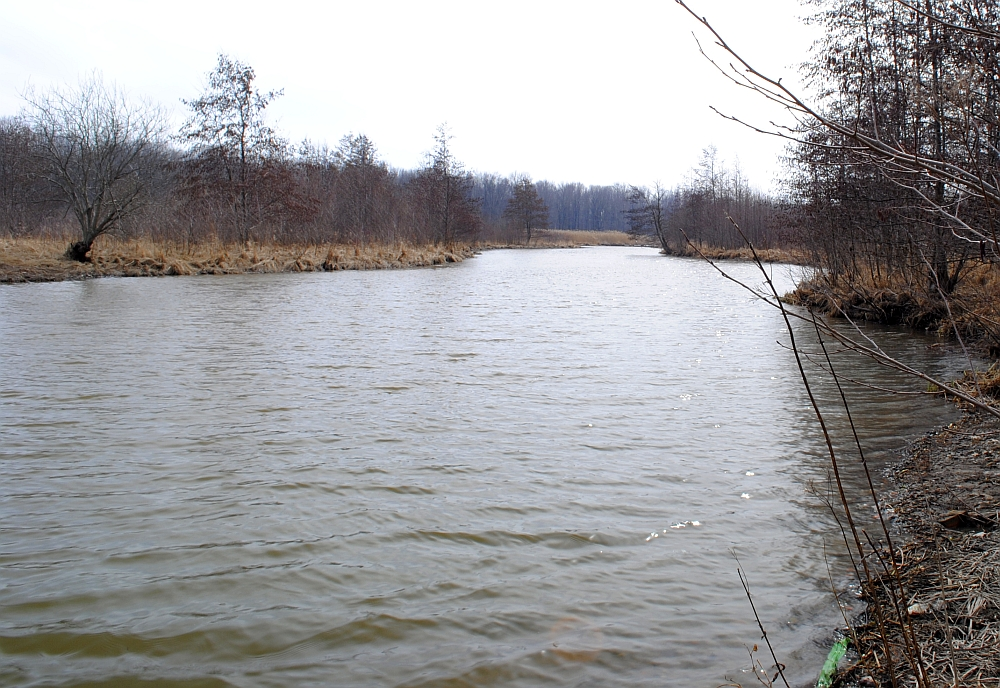
- Woods Creek is the west boundary of Buckhorn Island State Park.

- Location within New York
- Interactive map of Buckhorn Island State Park
- Type: State park
- Location: Grand Island, New York
- Nearest city: Niagara Falls, New York
- Coordinates: 43°03′22″N 78°59′00″W
- Area: 895 acres (3.62 km^{2})
- Created: 1935
- Operator: New York State Office of Parks, Recreation and Historic Preservation
- Visitors: 41,006 (in 2020)
- Open: All year
- Website: Buckhorn Island State Park

Buckhorn Island State Park is an 895-acre (3.62 km^{2}) state park located in Erie County, New York in the Town of Grand Island. The park is on the northern end of the island of Grand Island.

== Park description ==
Buckhorn Island State Park is primarily an exhibit of Niagara River wetlands, and is managed as a preserve. As such, the park offers space for largely passive recreational uses, such as biking, cross-country skiing, fishing, hiking, and a nature trail.

A portion of the park has been set aside as a bird conservation area in order to protect nesting habitat for several species listed as threatened in New York State, including the least bittern, northern harrier, common tern, and sedge wren. The protected habitat also serves as a feeding and breeding area for numerous other species of waterfowl. The park's wetlands serve as an overwintering location for 19 species of gulls, nearly half of the world's 45 species.

== See also ==
- List of New York state parks
- Navy Island National Historic Site of Canada
