= Henry Edward Fox =

British Army officer and colonial administrator (1755–1811)

General the Right Honourable Henry Edward Fox
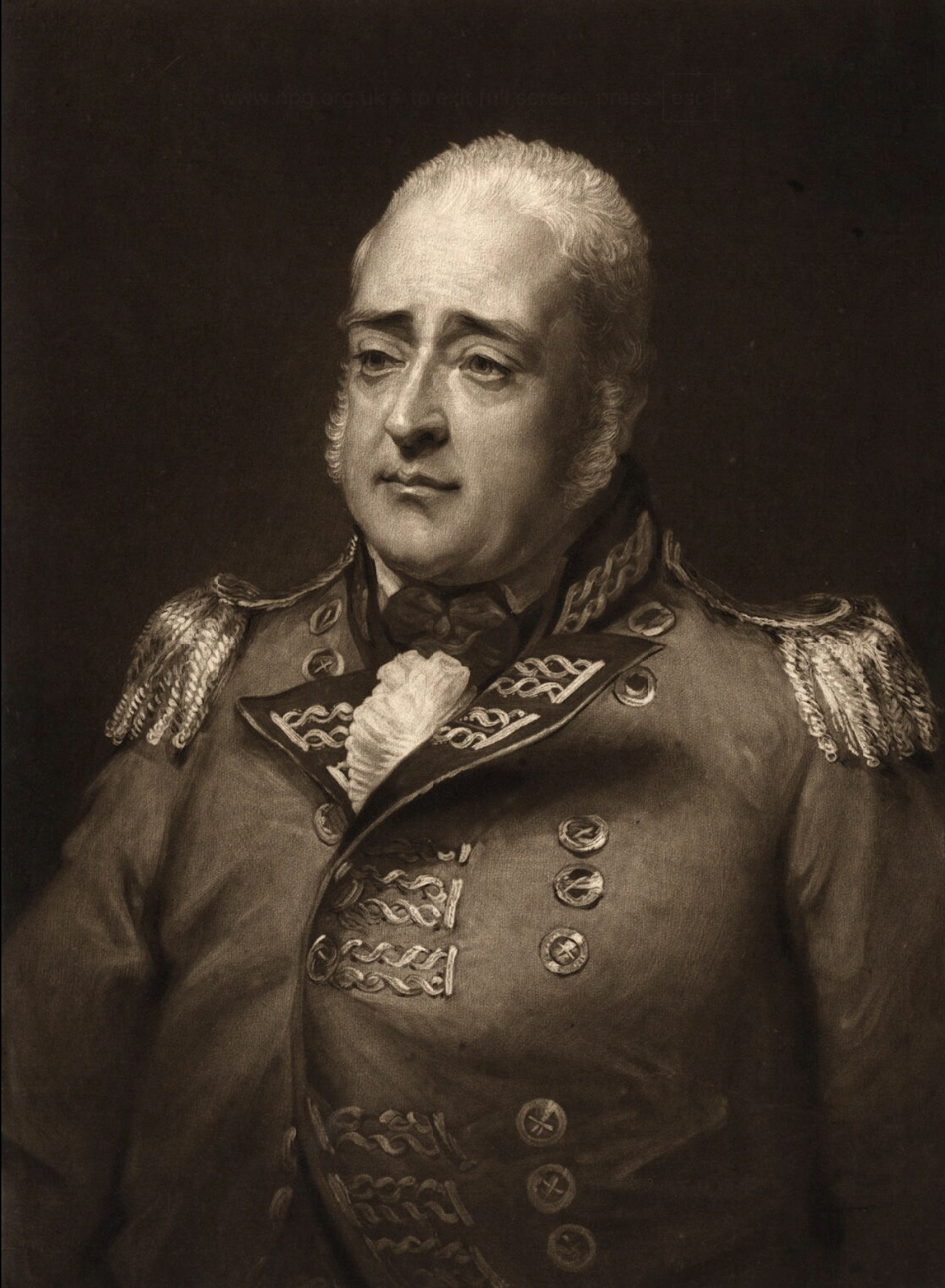
- Engraving by Charles Turner after a Thomas Phillips portrait, 1805
- Born: 4 March 1755
- Died: 18 July 1811 (aged 56)
- Spouse: Marianne Clayton
- Relatives: Henry Stephen Fox (son); Henry Fox, 1st Baron Holland (father); Lady Caroline Lennox (mother)
- Military career
- Allegiance: Great Britain; United Kingdom
- Branch: British Army
- Rank: General
- Conflicts: American Revolutionary War; French Revolutionary Wars; Irish Rebellion of 1803

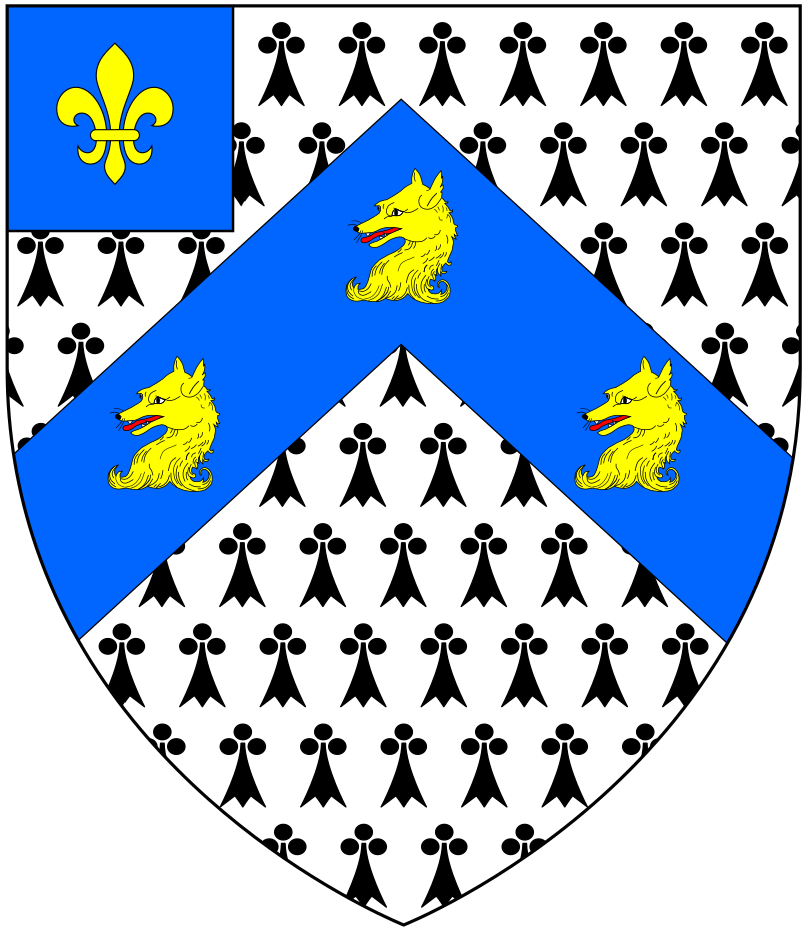
Canting arms of Fox, Baron Holland: Ermine, on a chevron azure three fox's heads and necks erased or on a canton of the second a fleur-de-lys of the third

General Henry Edward Fox (4 March 1755 – 18 July 1811) was a British Army officer and colonial administrator who served as the governor of Minorca and governor of Gibraltar.

== Family ==
He was a son of Henry Fox, 1st Baron Holland and Lady Caroline Lennox (1723–1774), and a younger brother of the politician Charles James Fox (1749–1806). His mother's father was Charles Lennox, 2nd Duke of Richmond (1701–1750), an illegitimate grandson of King Charles II.

== Life ==
He attended Westminster School before being commissioned as a cornet in the 1st King's Dragoon Guards in 1770. Soon after that he spent a year's leave at the military academy at Strasbourg. After his return he rose to lieutenant (1773) then captain (1774).

== American War of Independence ==
In 1773 he moved to the 38th Regiment of Foot, stationed at Boston, and fought in the American War of Independence (spending 1778–79 on leave in England). By the end of the war he had risen to colonel and king's aide-de-camp, and he then moved to command the forces in Nova Scotia (1783–89), where he was influential in the creation of the new colony of New Brunswick, and then the Chatham Barracks (1789–93).

== Later career ==
Next he was quartermaster-general on the duke of York's staff in Flanders to replace the recently killed James Moncrief (1793–95) and fought in the Netherlands theatre of the French Revolutionary Wars. He then served as Inspector-General of the recruiting service (1795–99), Colonel of the 10th (North Lincolnshire) Regiment (1795–1811), Lieutenant-governor of Minorca (1799–1801) following its capture from the French, commander in chief of all British Mediterranean forces outside Gibraltar (1801–03, replacing General Sir Ralph Abercromby fatally wounded at the battle of Alexandria) and finally Commander-in-Chief, Ireland (1803). In Ireland he was caught off-guard by Robert Emmet's Dublin uprising (23 July 1803) and was quickly replaced by Lieutenant-General Cathcart, whose appointment was gazetted on 20 October.

Fox moved to be commander of the London district (1803), Lieutenant-Governor of Gibraltar (1804–06), Commander-in-Chief in the Mediterranean (1806–07) and minister to Sicily. With his health weakening, Fox passed active command of the force to his deputy, Lieutenant-General Sir John Moore. The smallness of his force (made yet smaller when Major-General Mackenzie Fraser was sent to occupy Alexandria) meant he refused the repeated requests from the Sicilian court and William Drummond, British minister at the Sicilian court, for land operations on the Italian mainland. Fox and Moore also opposed Royal Navy officer Sidney Smith's political machinations at the Sicilian court, contrary as they were to the army's plans for the Italian theatre, until Fox's ill health finally led to his being recalled by the British government and replaced by Moore. Fox was promoted full general on 25 April 1808, appointed governor of Portsmouth in 1810 and died the following year.

== Marriage and issue ==
On 14 November 1786 he married Marianne Clayton, daughter of William Clayton, MP, of Harleyford Manor, and sister of William Clayton, 4th Baronet and Catherine, Lady Howard de Walden. They had 3 children:

- Louisa Amelia Fox (d. 1828), later wife of Major-General Sir Henry Bunbury
- Caroline Amelia Fox (d. 1860), who married Major-General William Napier
- Henry Stephen Fox (1791–1846), later the UK's envoy-extraordinary and minister-plenipotentiary to the United States of America

Military offices
Preceded by Sir Robert Murray Keith	Colonel of the 10th (the North Lincolnshire) Regiment of Foot; 1795–1811	Succeeded by Sir Thomas Maitland
Preceded by Sir William Medows	Commander-in-Chief, Ireland; 1803	Succeeded by Earl Cathcart
Preceded by Thomas Trigge (acting)	Governor of Gibraltar (acting); 1804–1806	Succeeded by Sir Hew Dalrymple
Preceded by Sir William Pitt	Governor of Portsmouth; 1810–1811	Succeeded by The Earl Harcourt
