= Republic of Upper Canada =

1837–1838 unrecognized state

Coordinates: 43.055437°N 79.009595°W

- 1837–1838
- Flag

- Territory controlled by the Republic of Upper Canada in 1837

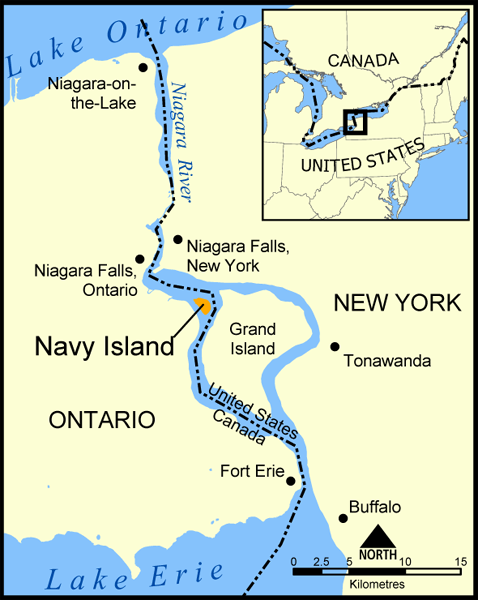
- Navy Island
- Status: Unrecognized state
- Capital: Navy Island
- Common languages: English
- Government: Republic
- President
  - 1837–1838: William Lyon Mackenzie
- Historical era: Upper Canada Rebellion
  - Republic declared: 13 December 1837
  - Republic collapsed: 14 January 1838
| Preceded by | Succeeded by |
| Upper Canada | Upper Canada |
- Today part of: Canada

The Republic of Upper Canada was a short-lived state proclaimed by William Lyon Mackenzie on December 13, 1837. It collapsed a month later on January 14, 1838. The self-proclaimed provisional government was established on Navy Island in the Niagara River during the Upper Canada Rebellion, part of the Rebellions of 1837–1838. It intended to usurp the colonial government of Upper Canada and institute American-style democratic reform.

== History ==
In 1837, Mackenzie convinced a thousand of his followers to support his aim of seizing control of the Upper Canadian government and declaring the colony a republic. They all began gathering at Montgomery's Tavern on December 4, with December 7 set for the date of their uprising. It was external influences such as the Lower Canada Rebellion which had inspired Mackenzie to revolt. On December 5, several hundred rebels marched on Yonge Street and had exchanged fire with loyalist militias. Many quickly fled in the confusion after the shooting began.

Soon after attempting to seize the armoury in Toronto, Mackenzie and 200 of his followers retreated to the United States. From there, they invaded Navy Island, and a provisional republican government was declared on December 13. He established an independent currency issued in the name of the Provisional Government of Upper Canada.

His camp was being supplied using an American supply steamer, the Caroline. He recruited followers by promising 300 acres (120 ha) of land to any man who would support his cause. He later included in his promise $100 in silver to his supporters, payable on May 1, 1838.

On December 29, Royal Navy Commander Andrew Drew and seven boatloads of Canadian militiamen crossed the Niagara River to Fort Schlosser. They captured the Caroline used by William Lyon Mackenzie and his rebels on Navy Island. Drew's forces set the ship alight and sent it adrift towards Niagara Falls, resulting in the death of one American. It was falsely reported that dozens of Americans were killed as they were trapped on board, and U.S. soldiers retaliated by burning a British steamer while it was in U.S. waters, triggering what became known as the Caroline affair.

On January 13, 1838, Mackenzie abandoned Navy Island under heavy fire from British troops. He and his force retreated to Buffalo, New York, from where they continued to mount raids against the colony. They were eventually captured by the American soldiers in 1839 and sentenced to 18 months' imprisonment in the United States for violating neutrality laws with the United Kingdom by inciting Americans to attack a foreign government. This ended the prospect of a Canadian declaration of independence/secession and what British authorities described as an inconsequential and unsupported colonial rebellion. Mackenzie himself spent a year in prison and spent the next ten years living in the US as a correspondent for the New York Daily Tribune and writing books. Some supporters of Mackenzie retreated to the Thousand Islands, and "caused Canadian authorities much anxiety" in mid-1838. Two rebels were hung in Toronto. Another twenty-nine were imprisoned in Montreal, and eventually got sent to Tasmania with rebels of the Lower Canada Rebellion.

=== The Patriots ===
In the United States, Hunters' Lodges had been established along the frontier border, with some also operating within Upper Canada. People belonging to these organizations were known as Hunters or Patriots. The organization of these societies was headquartered in Cleveland, and their principal mission was to "emancipate the British Colonies from British Thraldom".

From September 16 to 18 in 1838, a convention called the Grand Lodge attended by 160 delegates of the organization was held in Cleveland. During the proceedings, they elected Abram D. Smith as the president of the Republic of Upper Canada, Colonel Nathan Williams as the vice president, and the pirate Bill Johnson as the admiral of the Patriot navy. They believed they had 25,000 Patriots ready to fight for the cause.

The organization also defined plans to create a Republican Bank of Canada, which would use gold, silver, and its own currency as money, and pledged "the whole wealth, revenue, and resources" of Upper Canada as collateral for loans. Its first banknotes were to feature Samuel Lount, Peter Matthews, and James Morreau, all of whom were executed for their part in the rebellion.

Even though the Republic of Upper Canada and the Upper Canada Rebellion were put down in 1838, the Patriots would continue operating from the United States until September 15, 1841. President Tyler called for all citizens to sever their connection to the cause, and the organization fizzled out.

== Constitution ==
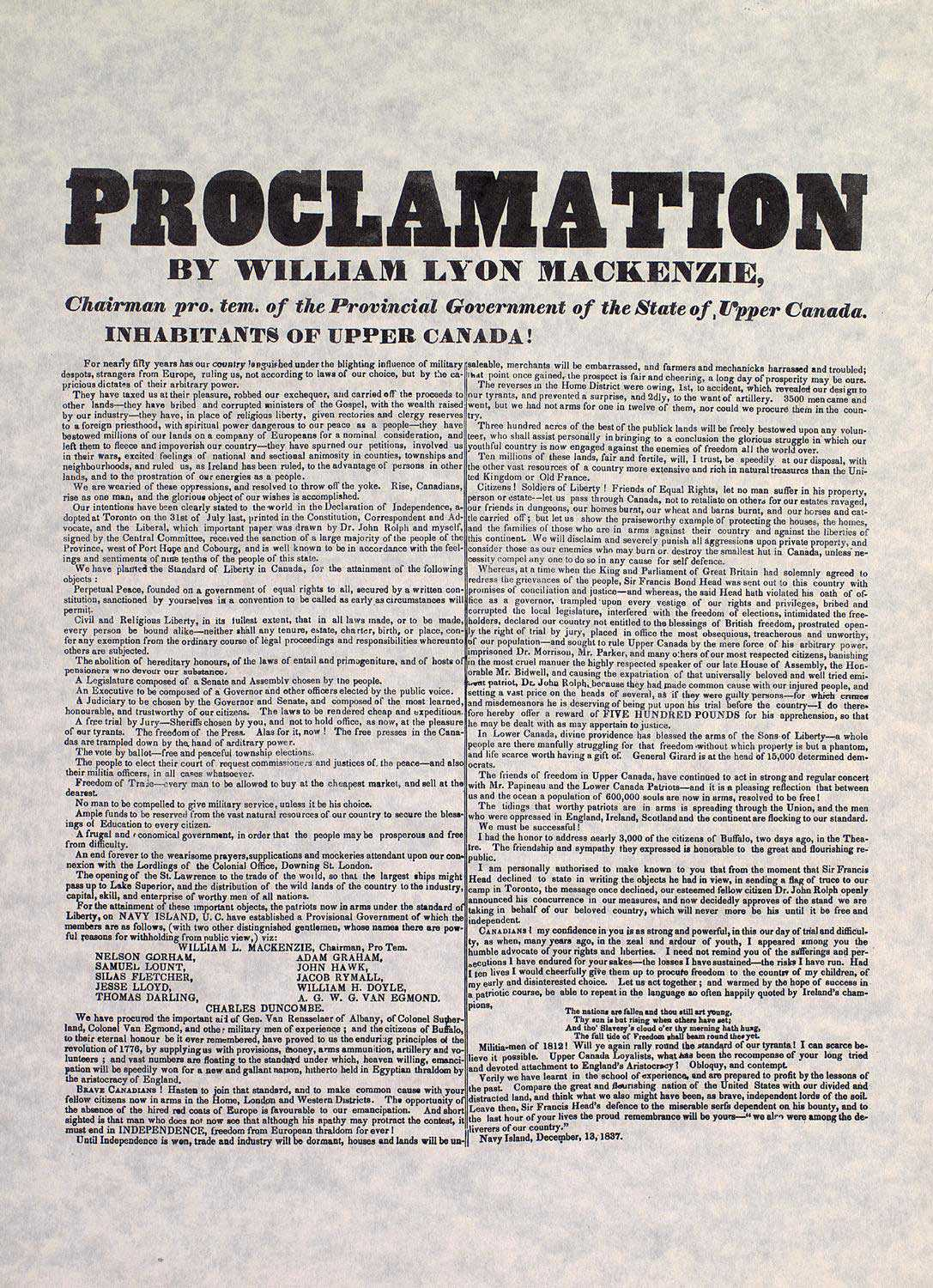
The proclamation and constitution of the provisional government

Mackenzie began writing a constitution for his provisional government in the summer of 1837, believing that conditions in Upper Canada began to match those that led to the Declaration of Independence in the United States. He published the document in Toronto on 15 November 1837, claiming in the preamble that the rights of Upper Canadians had been violated continuously by the British Government. It contained 80 clauses which defined the laws that would govern Upper Canada under his new state.

On religious matters, the republic was declared to be secular. However, no members of the clergy would be allowed to take a seat in the Senate or General Assembly, or be a civil or military officer. All hereditary privileges and honours were abolished. Slavery was outlawed, other than as a punishment for crimes, and people of colour were granted the same right as all other Canadians. Citizens were granted the right to bear arms, to defend themselves and the state. The composition of the legislature was defined along with how elections would be conducted. A Governor would have to sign all bills into law. Additionally, the Governor would nominate the Secretary of State, Comptroller, Receiver General, Auditor General, Surveyor General, Postmaster General, and judicial officers with the consent of the Senate.

=== Settler interests ===
Furthermore, some elements of the constitution may have intended to eradicate Indigenous rights in Upper Canada. Settler violence against Indigenous communities was common, and there were many prominent critics of how Indian Affairs was being administered. Mackenzie proposed measures that would allow the General Assembly to secure land surrenders from Indigenous peoples and generally abolish all limits to settler expansion.

== Flag ==
Digital render of the fully reconstructed flag featured at Fort Malden

The flag of the rebels was a similar to the French tricolour. Along the hoist were two stars, representing the rebels of Upper Canada and Lower Canada working to form breakaway states. Below them was a crescent that symbolized the Hunters' Lodges that supported them from the United States. A tattered specimen and a reconstruction of the complete flag are kept at Fort Malden. This flag can still be found today at military re-enactments of the Upper Canada Rebellion.

=== Bicolour variant ===
Reconstruction of the bicolour based on drawings in The Volunteer

While the tricolour is recognized to have been the primary flag of the republic, there is also a bicolour variant. It features two white stars on the blue field, representing the republics of both Upper and Lower Canada like the tricolour. Below them is the word "LIBERTY" written in red on the white field. The two flags share the same colour scheme of red, white, and blue. Presumably, these colours were adopted to gain the support of francophones who felt a connection with France and to evoke the spirit of the American and French revolutions.

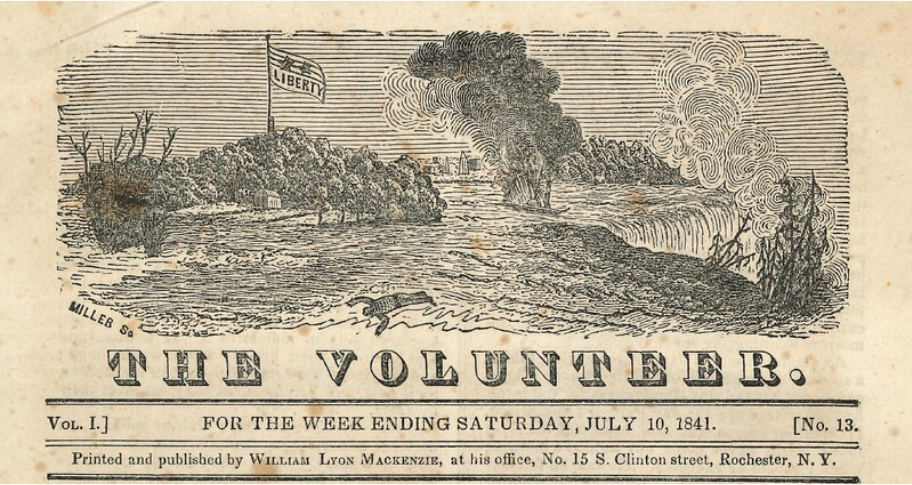
The Volunteer banner with the bicolour waving in the foreground

It is a popular design, but a lack of historical records or surviving specimens led to the Canadian Flag Association determining that it is actually a misinterpretation of the torn tricolour at Fort Malden, which happens to be missing its red band and crescent. The flag is sometimes depicted as being an entirely blue field with two stars, which certainly was not the case. However, a drawing of the flag does make multiple appearances as the banner of an 1841 newspaper called The Volunteer, a publication started by William Lyon Mackenzie.

== See also ==
- Republicanism in Canada
- Republic of Lower Canada
