= Big Six Mile Creek Marina =

US State Park

- Location within New York
- Interactive map of Big Six Mile Creek Marina
- Type: State park
- Location: 3219 Whitehaven Road; Grand Island, New York
- Nearest city: Grand Island, New York
- Coordinates: 43°01′23″N 79°00′40″W
- Area: 21 acres (0.085 km^{2})
- Operator: New York State Office of Parks, Recreation and Historic Preservation
- Visitors: 62,368 (in 2020)
- Open: May through November
- Website: Big Six Mile Creek Marina

Big Six Mile Creek Marina is a 21-acre (0.085 km^{2}) state park and marina located on the upper Niagara River on Grand Island in Erie County, New York.

The Marina is in the path of totality for the 2024 solar eclipse, with 3 minutes and 38 seconds of totality.

== Park description ==
Big Six Mile Creek Marina is located in a protected valley along a tributary to the Niagara River, and features the only public boat launch facilities on the western side of Grand Island.

The park offers a marina with 134 seasonal boat slips, as well as a boat launch ramp and fishing access. The park is open from May through November.

The park's facilities and docks, initially constructed in the 1950s, were improved and reconstructed in 2013.

== See also ==
- List of New York state parks
