= Carly Beth =

American singer-songwriter (born 1997)

- 王韵藍
- Born: March 14, 1997 (age 29)
- Occupations: Singer; songwriter; pianist
- Years active: 2014–present
- Website: carlybeth.com

Carly Beth (Chinese: 王韵藍) (born 1997) is an American singer-songwriter from Grand Island, New York. She is known for her piano solos and viral success performing on multiple social media platforms.

== Early life and career ==
Beth grew up in Grand Island in western New York. She began taking piano lessons as a child and started to compose piano solos at the age of nine. She continued to receive classical training throughout high school.

At the age of 15, Beth wrote and produced an album of 12 piano solos called Taking Flight, which was released in 2014. Her album was recognized by Jim Brickman, a pianist and songwriter who invited Beth to perform on stage with him after hearing her album.

Although she is classically trained after her first album, Beth started writing pop songs on both the piano and guitar. In 2016 Beth began studying at the University of Westminster in London. She graduated with a Bachelor of Arts in Commercial Music Performance.

== Social media success ==
While at college in London, Beth met a Chinese friend who proposed that she perform music on a popular Chinese live streaming app, Yingke (映客). On the app, she sang her original music and covers in both English and Chinese. After nine months, Beth had a following of 45,000 fans on the platform. In 2017, she became one of the top musician broadcasters on the app, regularly having over 110,000 simultaneous viewers on her live-streamed performances.

After her success on Yingke, Beth began posting videos on Facebook, where a video of her playing and singing the Shape of You by Ed Sheeran reached 4.3 million views. After this she began live-streaming on Facebook.

In 2017, Beth began working with Jimmy Bralower, a multiple Grammy award winning musician. With him helping as a producer, she released a single titled Sleepless Lullaby in February 2019.
