= Preventive war =

Military action to prevent an enemy from acquiring attack capabilities

A preventive war is an armed conflict "initiated in the belief that military conflict, while not imminent, is inevitable, and that to delay would involve greater risk." The party which is being attacked has a latent threat capability or it has shown that it intends to attack in the future, based on its past actions and posturing. A preventive war aims to forestall a shift in the balance of power by strategically attacking before the balance of power has had a chance to shift in the favor of the targeted party. Preventive war is distinct from preemptive strike, which is the first strike when an attack is imminent. Preventive uses of force "seek to stop another state [...] from developing a military capability before it becomes threatening or to hobble or destroy it thereafter, whereas [p]reemptive uses of force come against a backdrop of tactical intelligence or warning indicating imminent military action by an adversary."

== Concept ==
Scholars debate how to define a preventive war. For some, a preventive war must have some preventive motives, but for others, the preventive motives must be the key factors in the decision to go to war.

Some link preventive wars to power transitions, as one state seeks to forestall adverse shift in the distribution of power between it and another state.

== Criticism ==
The majority view is that a preventive war undertaken without the approval of the United Nations is illegal under the modern framework of international law. The consensus is that preventive war "goes beyond what is acceptable in international law" and lacks legal basis. The UN High-level Panel on Threats, Challenges and Change stopped short of rejecting the concept outright but suggested that there is no right to preventive war. If there are good grounds for initiating preventive war, the matter should be put to the UN Security Council, which can authorize such action, given that one of the Council's main functions under Chapter VII of the UN Charter ("Action with Respect to Threats to the Peace, Breaches of the Peace, and Acts of Aggression") is to enforce the obligation of member states under Article 4, Paragraph 2 to "refrain in their international relations from the threat or use of force against the territorial integrity or political independence of any state." The Charter's drafters assumed that the Council might need to employ preventive force to forestall aggression such as initiated by Nazi Germany in the 1930s.

== Examples ==
=== World War II ===
The Axis powers in World War II routinely invaded neutral countries on grounds of prevention and began the invasion of Poland in 1939 by claiming the Poles had attacked a border outpost first. In 1940, Germany invaded Denmark and Norway and argued that Britain might have used them as launching points for an attack or prevented supply of strategic materials to Germany. In the summer of 1941, Germany invaded the Soviet Union, inaugurating the bloody and brutal land war by claiming that a Judeo-Bolshevik conspiracy threatened the Reich. In late 1941, the Anglo-Soviet invasion of Iran was carried out to secure a supply corridor of petrol to the Soviet Union. Iranian Shah Rezā Shāh appealed to US President Franklin Roosevelt for help but was rebuffed on the grounds that "movements of conquest by Germany will continue and will extend beyond Europe to Asia, Africa, and even to the Americas, unless they are stopped by military force."

==== Pearl Harbor ====
The attack on Pearl Harbor by the Empire of Japan on December 7, 1941 has been characterized as a preventive war. Many in the US and Japan believed war to be inevitable. Coupled to the crippling US economic embargo that was rapidly degrading the Japanese military capability, that led the Japanese leadership to believe it was better to have the war as soon as possible. However, others have argued that rather than being motivated by grand strategic fears of decline, the Japanese started the war due to domestic and psychological pathologies.

The sneak attack was partly motivated by a desire to destroy the US Pacific Fleet to allow Japan to advance with reduced opposition from the US when it secured Japanese oil supplies by fighting against the British Empire and the Dutch Empire for control over the rich East Indian (Dutch East Indies, Malay Peninsula) oil-fields. In 1940, American policies and tension toward Japanese military actions and Japanese expansionism in the Far East increased. For example, in May 1940, the base of the US Pacific Fleet that was stationed on the West Coast was forwarded to an "advanced" position at Pearl Harbor in Honolulu, Hawaii.

The move was opposed by some US Navy officials, including their commander, Admiral James Otto Richardson, who was relieved by Roosevelt. Even so, the Far East Fleet was not significantly reinforced. Another ineffective plan to reinforce the Pacific was a rather late relocation of fighter planes to bases located on the Pacific islands like Wake Island, Guam, and the Philippines. For a long time, Japanese leaders, especially leaders of the Imperial Japanese Navy, had known that the large US military strength and production capacity posed a long-term threat to Japan's imperialist desires, especially if hostilities broke out in the Pacific. War games on both sides had long reflected those expectations.

=== Iraq War ===
The 2003 invasion of Iraq was framed primarily as a preemptive war by the George W. Bush administration, although President George W. Bush also argued it was supported by Security Council Resolutions: "Under Resolutions 678 and 687—both still in effect—the United States and our allies are authorized to use force in ridding Iraq of weapons of mass destruction." At the time, the US public and its allies were led to believe that Ba'athist Iraq might have restarted its nuclear weapons program or been "cheating" on its obligations to dispose of its large stockpile of chemical weapons dating from the Iran–Iraq War. Supporters of the war have argued it to be justified, as Iraq both harbored Islamic terrorist groups sharing a common hatred of the United States and was suspected to be developing weapons of mass destruction (WMD). Iraq's history of noncompliance of international security matters and its history of both developing and using such weapons were factors in the public perception of Iraq's having weapons of mass destruction.

In support of an attack on Iraq, US President George W. Bush stated in an address to the UN General Assembly on September 12, 2002 that the Iraqi "regime is a grave and gathering danger." However, despite extensive searches during the several years of occupation, the suspected weapons of mass destruction or weapons program infrastructure alleged by the Bush administration were not found to be functional or even known to most Iraqi leaders. Coalition forces instead found dispersed and sometimes-buried and partially dismantled stockpiles of abandoned and functionally expired chemical weapons. Some of the caches had been dangerously stored and were leaking, and many were then disposed of hastily and in secret, leading to secondary exposure from improper handling. Allegations of mismanagement and information suppression followed.

=== Twelve-Day War ===
The Twelve-Day War in June 2025 was a preventive war launched by Israel to prevent Iran from developing nuclear weapons. While Israeli officials called the war a "preemptive strike", the legal and strategic reality fit preventive rather than preemptive definitions. Preemptive strikes respond to imminent threats when the signs of attack are present, while preventive strikes respond to a generalized threats of war in more distant future and are based on calculations that fighting now is better than fighting later. Israel is removing the source of a threat by surprise and on their own timetable.

=== Iran War ===
On February 28, 2026, the United States and Israel launched surprise attacks against Iran, triggering the 2026 Iran war. The strikes targeted several military and government sites and assassinated several senior Iranian officials including Supreme Leader Ali Khamenei. The United States and Israel framed the strikes as a preemptive war of self-defense. The Trump administration presented various rationales for the war, including warding off an imminent Iranian threat, pre-empting Iranian retaliation against U.S. bases and assets after an expected Israeli attack on Iran, to prevent Iran from obtaining a nuclear weapon, and to achieve regime change by bringing the Iranian opposition to power. U.S. President Donald Trump said that the strikes aimed to "prevent this very wicked, radical dictatorship from threatening America and our core national security interests."

== Case for preventive nuclear war ==
Since 1945, World War III between the United States and the Soviet Union was perceived by many as inevitable and imminent. Many high officials in the US military sector and some renowned luminaries in non-military fields advocated preventive war. According to their rationale, total war is inevitable, and it was senseless to permit the Russians to develop a nuclear parity with the United States. Hence the sooner the preventive war come the better, because the first strike is almost surely decisive and less devastating. Dean Acheson and James Burnham adhered to the version that the war is not inevitable but is already going on, although the American people still do not realize it.

The US military sector widely and wholeheartedly shared the idea of preventive war. Most prominent proponents included Defense Secretary Louis A. Johnson, JCS Chairman Admiral Arthur W. Radford, Navy Secretary Francis P. Matthews, Admiral Ralph A. Ofstie, Air Force Secretary W. Stuart Symington, Air Force Chiefs Curtis LeMay and Nathan F. Twining, Air Force Generals George Kenney and Orvil A. Anderson, General Leslie Groves (the wartime commander of the Manhattan Project) and CIA Director Walter Bedell Smith. NSC-100 and several studies by SAC and JCS during the Korean War advocated preventive war too.

In Congress, preventive warriors counted Deputy Secretary of Defense Paul Nitze, expert on the Soviet Union Charles E. Bohlen of the State Department, Senators John L. McClellan, Paul H. Douglas, Eugene D. Millikin, Brien McMahon (Chairman of the Atomic Energy Committee), William Knowland and Congressman Henry M. Jackson. The diplomatic circle included distinguished diplomats like George Kennan, William C. Bullitt (US Ambassador to Moscow), and John Paton Davies (from the same embassy).

John von Neumann of the Manhattan Project and later a consultant for the RAND Corporation expressed: "With the Russians it is not a question of whether but of when… If you say why not bomb them tomorrow, I say why not today?" Other renowned scientists and thinkers, such as Leo Szilard, William L. Laurence, James Burnham, and Bertrand Russell. joined the preventive effort. The preventive war in the late 1940s was argued by “some very dedicated Americans.” “Realists” repeatedly proposed the preventive war. "The argument—prevent before it is too late—was quite common in the early atomic age and by no way limited to “the lunatic fringe.” A famous atomic scientist expressed a concern: In 1946, public discussion of international problems, in the United States at least, "has moved dangerously towards a consideration of so-called preventive war. One sees this tendency perhaps most markedly in the trend of news in Americans newspapers."

Bernard Brodie noted that at least prior to 1950, preventive war was a “live issue … among a very small but earnest minority of American citizens.” The dating of Brodie is too short, as the preventive war doctrine has had increasing support since the Korean War started. The late summer 1950 saw “a flurry of articles” in the public press dealing with preventive war. One of them in Time magazine (September 18, 1950) called for a buildup, followed by a “showdown” with the Russians by 1953. “1950 may have marked the high tide of ‘preventive war’ agitation...” According to Gallup poll of July 1950, right after the outbreak of the War, 14% of the polled opined for the immediate declaration of war on the USSR, the percentage which only slightly declined by the end of the War. “So preventive war thinking was surprisingly widespread in the early nuclear age, the period from mid-1945 through late 1954.”

The preventive warriors remained minority in America’s postwar political arena, and Washington’s elder statesmen soundly rejected their arguments. However, during several of the East-West confrontations that marked the first decade of the Cold War, well-placed officials in both the Truman and Eisenhower administrations urged their Presidents to launch preventive strikes on the Soviet Union. Entry in Harry S. Truman’s secret personal journal on January 27, 1952 tells:

It seems to me that the proper approach now would be an ultimatum with a ten-days expiration limit informing Moscow that we intend to blockade the China coast … and that we intend to destroy every military base in Manchuria … by means now at our control and if there is any further interference we shall eliminate any ports or cities necessary to accomplish our peaceful purposes. This means all-out war. It means Moscow, St. Petersburg, Mukden, Vladivostok, Beijing… and every manufacturing plant in China and the Soviet Union will be eliminated. This is the final chance for the Soviet Government to decide whether it desires to survive or not.

In 1953, President Dwight D. Eisenhower wrote in a summary memorandum to his Secretary of State, John Foster Dulles: In present circumstances, "we would be forced to consider whether or not out duty to future generations did not require us to initiate war at the most propitious moment we could designate.” In May 1954, the JCS’s Advance Study Group proposed to Eisenhower to consider “deliberately precipitating war with the USSR in the near future,” before Soviet thermonuclear capability became a real menace. The same year, Eisenhower asked in a meeting of National Security Council: “Should the United States now get ready to fight the Soviet Union?” and pointed out that “he had brought up this question more than once at prior Council meetings and he had never done so facetiously.” By the fall 1954, Eisenhower made his mind up and approved a Basic National Security Policy paper which stated unequivocally that “the United States and its allies must reject the concept of preventive war, or acts intended to provoke war.”

Winston Churchill was more resolved on the preventive war. He argued repeatedly in the late 1940s that matters needed to be brought to a head with the Soviets before it was too late, while the United States still enjoyed a nuclear monopoly. Charles de Gaulle in 1954 regretted that now it was too late. Curtis LeMay and Henry Kissinger later expressed the same regret over missed opportunity.

== See also ==
- A Clean Break: A New Strategy for Securing the Realm
- Command responsibility
- Caroline affair
- Pre-emptive nuclear strike
- Imperialism
- Jus ad bellum
- Kellogg–Briand Pact
- Legality of the Iraq War
- Military science
- UN Charter
