= Richard Pakenham =

British diplomat

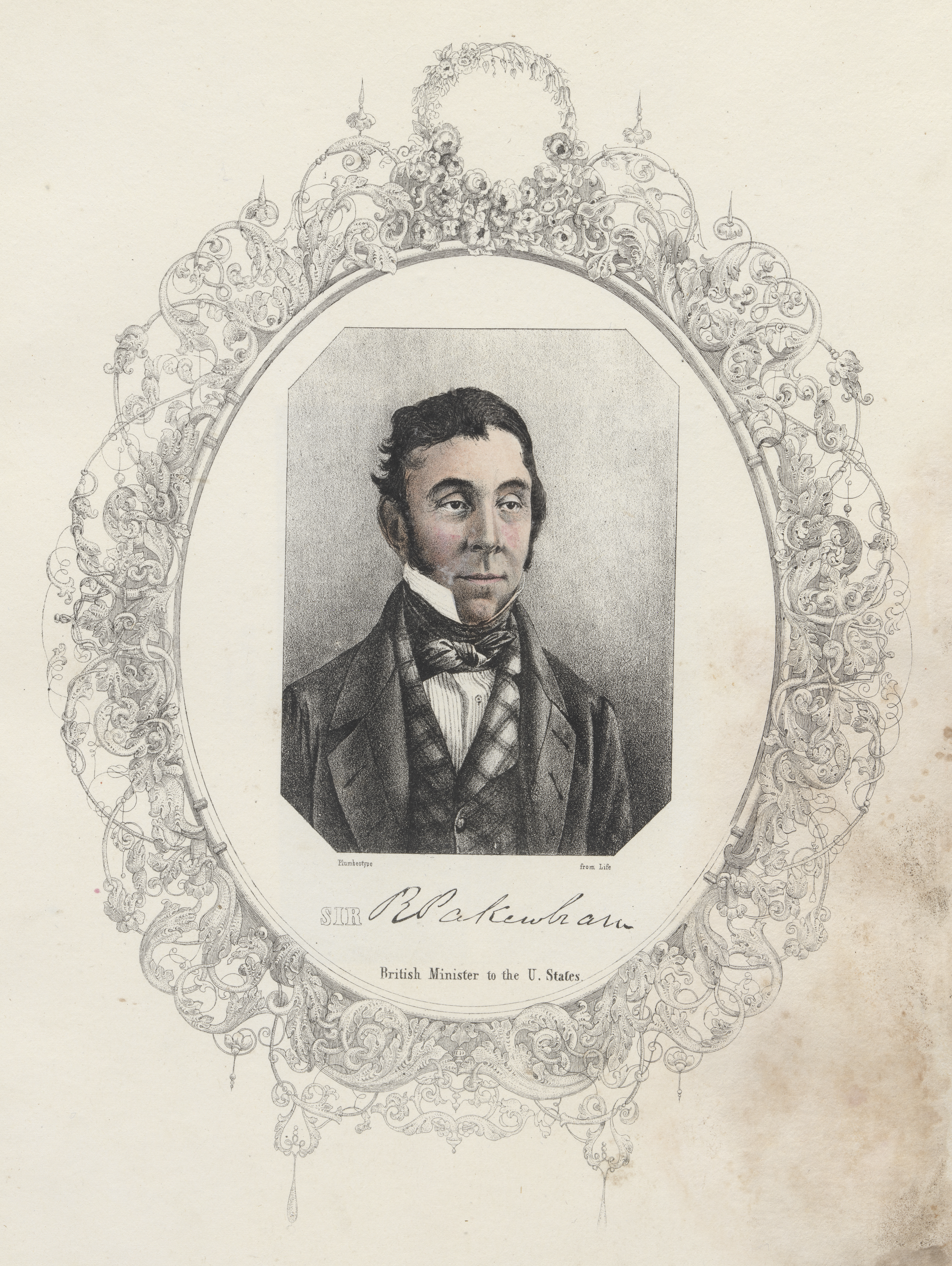
Richard Pakenham by John Plumbe, Jr., 1847

Sir Richard Pakenham PC (19 May 1797 – 28 October 1868) was a British diplomat of Anglo-Irish background. He served as British Ambassador to the United States from 1843 until 1847, during which time he unsuccessfully worked to prevent the U.S. annexation of Texas and California by establishing British forces there instead.

== Early life ==
Pakenham, the fifth son of Admiral Sir Thomas Pakenham, by his wife, Louisa, daughter of the Right Hon. John Staples, was born at Pakenham Hall, County Westmeath, Ireland. He completed his education at Trinity College, Dublin, and, apparently without waiting to take a degree, entered the Foreign Office on 15 October 1817.

== Career ==
His first appointment was as attaché to his uncle, the Earl of Clancarty, at The Hague. His next appointment was as secretary of the legation in Switzerland (26 January 1824). On 29 December 1826 he was appointed to the same position in Mexico; on 12 March 1835, he was promoted to Minister Plenipotentiary to Mexico. In this capacity he seems to have been popular and efficient.

Perhaps the most troublesome of his negotiations was for the abolition of the slave trade: the Mexican government objected to the right of search, and negotiations dragged on for four years, but he obtained a treaty in 1841. He was in Mexico during the Pastry War between Mexico and France, and in February 1839 was dispatched to Veracruz with the object of trying to effect a reconciliation between the two countries.

On 13 December 1843, while on leave in England, he was made a privy councillor, and on 14 December he was appointed Envoy Extraordinary and Minister Plenipotentiary to the United States of America. Here some thorny questions awaited him. One of his first duties was that of the Oregon boundary. In this negotiation, though he did not carry the British points, he obtained the approval of his government, which signed the Oregon Treaty in 1846. The attitude of Great Britain regarding Texas proved of greater difficulty. The relations between the two governments were not very cordial and irritation was easily provoked on both sides.

Pakenham left Washington on a leave of absence in May 1847, and, after remaining in Europe for an unusually prolonged period, ultimately preferred to retire on a pension rather than return. He resumed his career on 28 April 1851 as Envoy Extraordinary and Minister Plenipotentiary to Lisbon. Here, his diplomatic work was less arduous and he rapidly ingratiated himself with the royal family of Portugal.

In May 1855, he came to England on leave, and at his own request, on 28 June, retired on pension. However, on 7 August, he was sent back to Lisbon on a special mission to congratulate King Pedro V of Portugal on attaining his majority. He returned to England once more in October 1855, was awarded a diplomatic pension of the second class, and retired to Coolure, Castlepollard, where he died, unmarried in 1868.

Diplomatic posts
Preceded by Henry Stephen Fox	British Ambassador to the United States; 1843 – 1847	Succeeded by Henry Bulwer
