= Guy Roberts =

Guy Roberts may refer to:

- Guy Roberts (American football, born 1900) (1900–1993), American football player
- Guy Roberts (linebacker) (born 1950), American football player
- Guy B. Roberts, American government official
