= Caroline affair =

1837-42 diplomatic crisis between the US, UK, and Canadian rebels

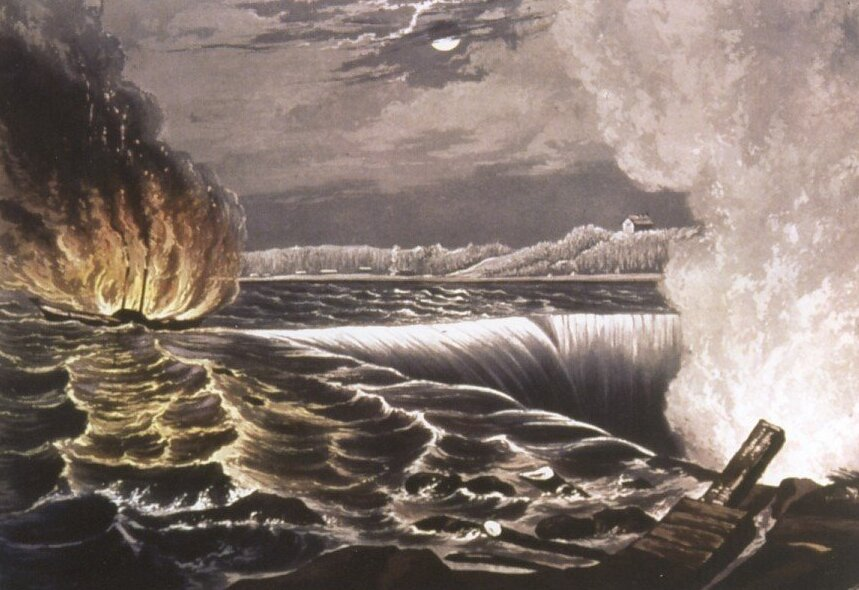
The Destruction of the Caroline by George Tattersall

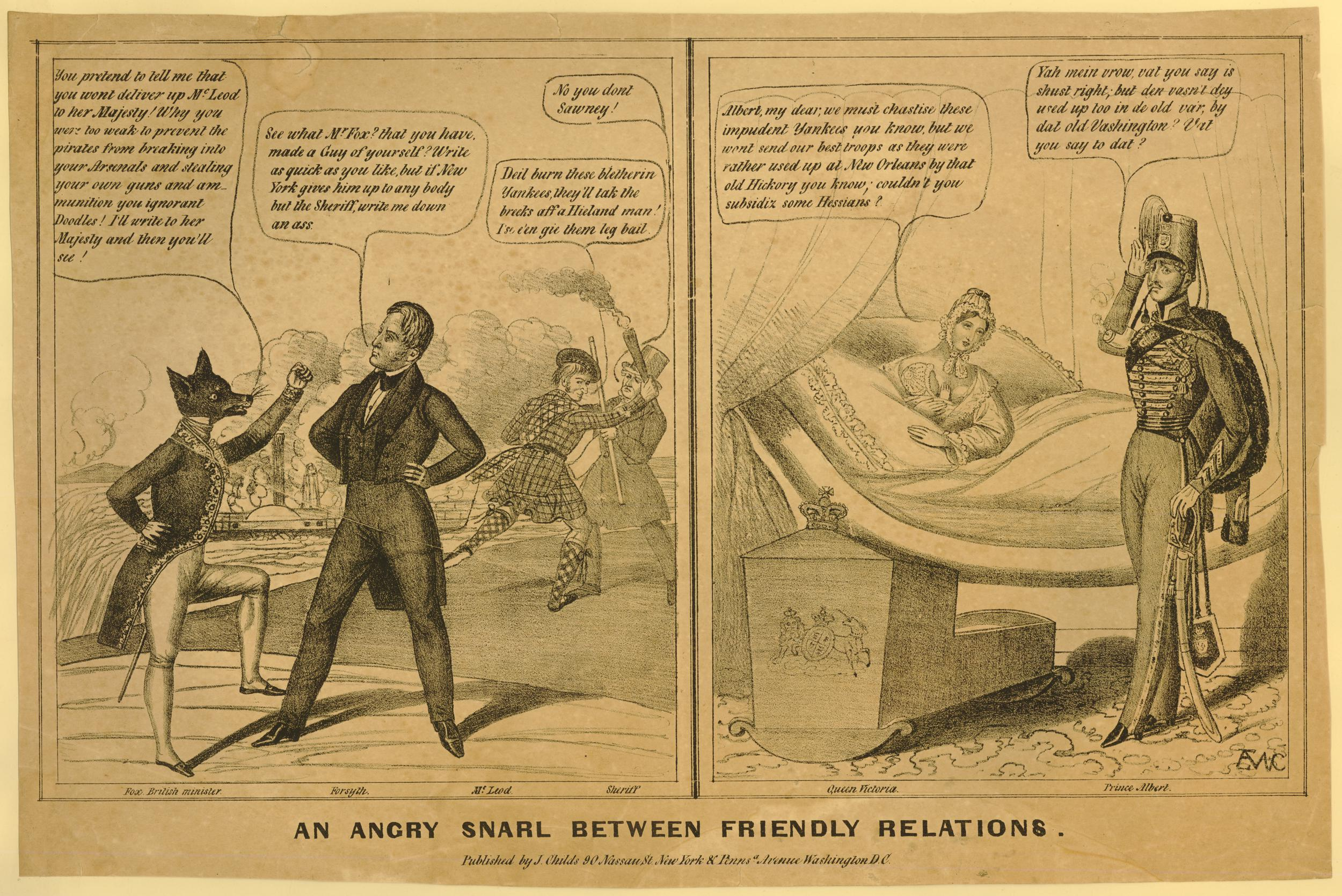
An Angry Snarl Between Friendly Relations, an American cartoon about the affair

The Caroline affair, also known as the Caroline case, was a diplomatic and military incident between the United States and the United Kingdom that began in December 1837 and unfolded over several years, eventually influencing the development of international law. The incident originated during the aftermath of the failed Upper Canada Rebellion, a movement aimed at reforming the British colonial government in Canada. After suffering defeat in battle, Canadian leader William Lyon Mackenzie and his followers fled to Navy Island in the Niagara River, where they declared a short-lived "Republic of Canada" and received support from American sympathizers across the border. Supplies and volunteers were transported to the island by the American steamboat Caroline.

On the night of December 29, a force of Canadian militiamen and law enforcement officials crossed into U.S. territory and drove off Caroline's crews while it was moored at Schlosser's Landing in New York before setting the ship on fire and sending her over Niagara Falls; American Amos Durfee was killed during the incident. Sensationalized newspaper accounts inflamed public opinion in the United States, where many called for war with Britain. In retaliation, a group of Americans destroyed a British steamer. The situation nearly led to armed conflict between the two nations but was eventually addressed through diplomatic negotiations that also resolved other territorial disputes in the Webster–Ashburton Treaty of 1842.

During negotiations, U.S. Secretary of State Daniel Webster and British envoy Lord Ashburton exchanged correspondence that helped establish the principle of "anticipatory self-defense" in international law. Known as the Caroline test, it set a high threshold for the use of force across borders, requiring that such action be justified only when the necessity of self-defense is "instant, overwhelming, and leaving no choice of means, and no moment for deliberation."

== Background ==
The Reform Movement in Upper Canada was founded to make the British colonial administration in Canada more democratic and less corrupt. William Lyon Mackenzie was one of the key leaders of this movement. He was repeatedly elected to serve in a hostile parliament that repeatedly ejected him for his reform efforts. By 1837, Mackenzie had given up on peaceful means for reform and began to prepare for an uprising.

In December 1837, Mackenzie began the Upper Canada Rebellion by fighting government troops in the Battle of Montgomery's Tavern. His forces were heavily outnumbered and outgunned, and they were defeated in less than an hour. Mackenzie's allies suffered another major setback a few days later in London. After these defeats, Mackenzie and his followers fled to Navy Island in the Niagara River, which they declared the foundation of the Republic of Canada on board the vessel Caroline. Throughout these events, the Canadian rebels enjoyed widespread support from American citizens, who provided them supplies and bases from which to launch raids on the British authorities in Canada.

== Burning of Caroline ==
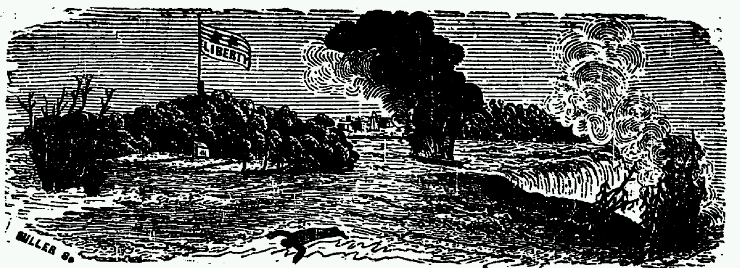
An 1841 sketch by MacKenzie showing Durfee's body lying on the ground while the burning wreck of Caroline drifts toward the Niagara Falls in the background

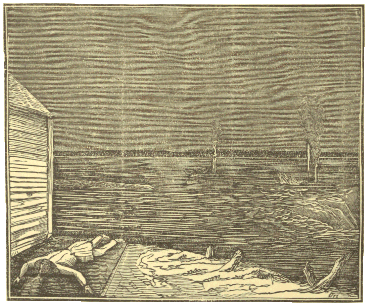
An 1885 illustration of the incident showing Durfee's body

On December 29, 1837, Canadian Militia Colonel Allan MacNab and Royal Navy Captain Andrew Drew led a force of militiamen and law enforcement officials across the Canada–United States border. The force chased off the crew of Caroline, towed the vessel into the currents of the Niagara River and set her on fire before casting the ship adrift; Caroline proceeded to float over Niagara Falls and was destroyed. During the confrontation between the Canadian force and Caroline's crew, which involved shots being fired, and a Black American watchmaker, Amos Durfee, was accidentally killed by an unknown person. As news of the burning spread, American newspapers falsely reported "the death of twenty-two of her crew" when only Durfee was killed. Public opinion in the United States was outraged over the burning, and President Martin Van Buren protested to the government of the United Kingdom over the incident.

The British ambassador to the United States, Henry Stephen Fox wrote in an 1841 letter to the American politician John Forsyth, stating:

The steamboat Caroline was a hostile vessel engaged in piratical war against her Majesty's people... it was under such circumstances, which it is to be hoped will never recur, that the vessel was attacked by a party of her Majesty's people, captured and destroyed.

Attorney General of New York Willis Hall responded by stating:

Those of our fellow citizens... single-handed and alone, left our territory and united themselves with a foreign power, have violated no law... they have done no more than has been done again and again by the people of every nation. Your own recollections of history will furnish your minds with hundreds of examples. The Swiss nation have, for hundreds of years, fed all the armies of Europe; and who ever thought of holding them responsible for it? They did no more than Admiral Lord Cochrane did in taking part with South America. They did no more than Lord Byron did, who gave his life to aid the Greeks in breaking the chains of Turkish bondage. They did no more than Lafayette. Gentlemen, I am not deviating from the case further than is necessary to remove the just odium which has been unjustly thrown upon those who joined the insurgents.

== Aftermath ==
News of the incident led to a public uproar in the United States, and many people in American towns bordering Canada demanded the U.S. government declare war on Britain. In contrast, the burning was celebrated by the Canadian public, and MacNab was knighted for his efforts. Canadian Sheriff Alexander McLeod was arrested in the United States while travelling there in 1840 for allegations over his role in the death of Durfee. The arrest led to another international incident as British authorities demanded his release, arguing that McLeod could not be held criminally responsible because he was legally carrying out orders of the Crown. McLeod was placed on trial, during which American legal officials unsuccessfully attempted to identify who shot Durfee. McLeod was acquitted, as witness statements made it clear that he had no involvement in the incident.

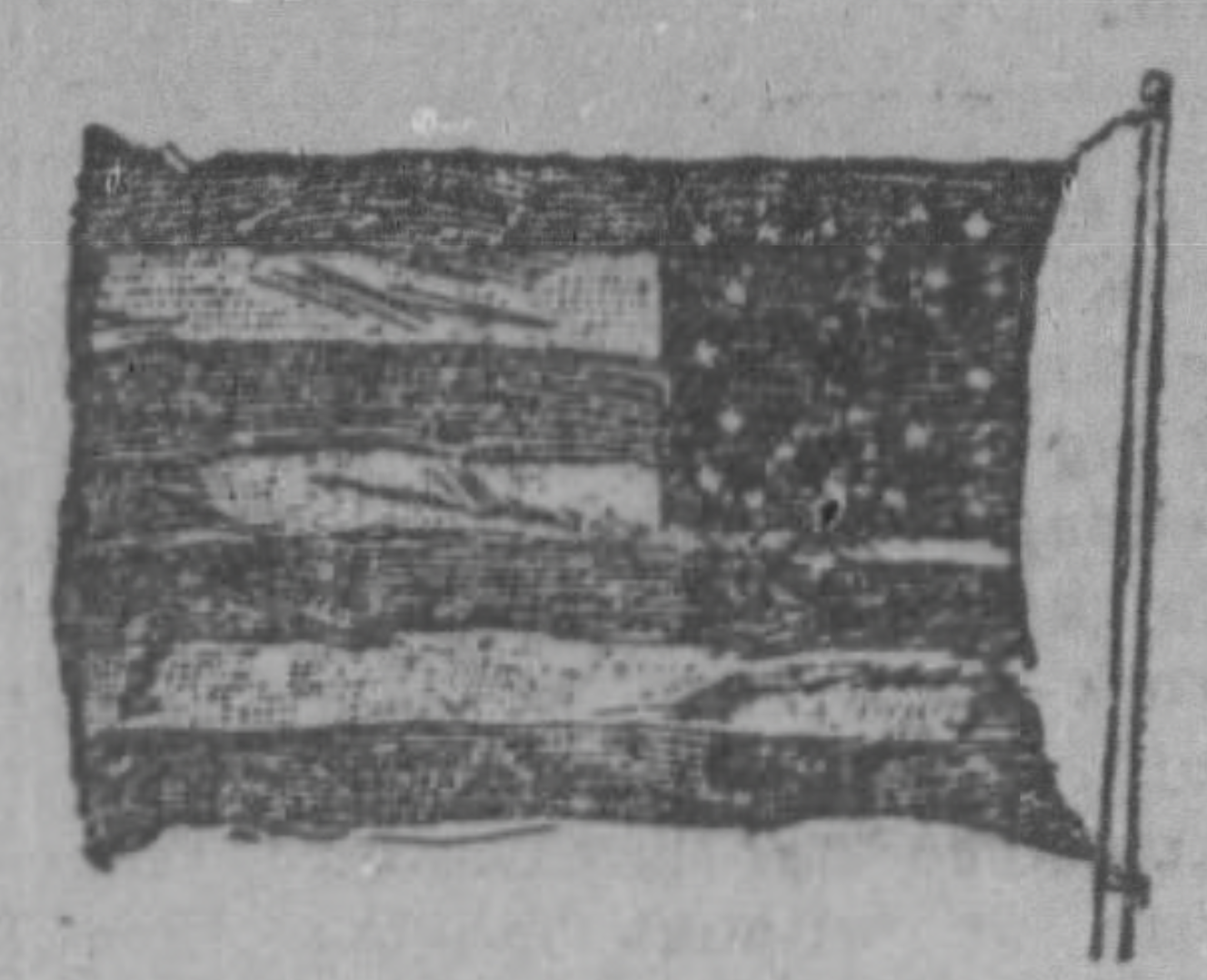
24 star American flag captured by the British from the Caroline, illustrated in 1903

In response to the incident, a group of 13 Americans captured and burned the British merchant steamer Sir Robert Peel while she was in American waters. Van Buren sent General Winfield Scott to prevent further American incursions into Canada.

Correspondence between U.S. Secretary of State Daniel Webster and British minister to the United States Lord Ashburton outlined the conditions under which one nation might lawfully violate the territorial sovereignty of another state. The Caroline test states that exceptions do exist to territorial inviolability, but "those exceptions should be confined to cases in which the necessity of that self-defense is instant, overwhelming, and leaving no choice of means, and no moment for deliberation". According to academic Tom Nichols, the Caroline test remains an accepted part of international law today. In 2008, he wrote:

Thus the destruction of an insignificant ship in what one scholar has called a "comic opera affair" in the early 19th century nonetheless led to the establishment of a principle of international law that would govern, at least in theory, the use of force for over 250 years. [sic]

== See also ==
- Aroostook War, militias mobilized but no battles
- Nootka Crisis, Spain-Britain dispute
- Pig War (1859), US–Britain border dispute in the Pacific Northwest
- Timeline of United States diplomatic history
