= List of ambassadors of the United Kingdom to the United States =

His Britannic Majesty’s Ambassador to the United States of America
- Royal arms of His Majesty's Government

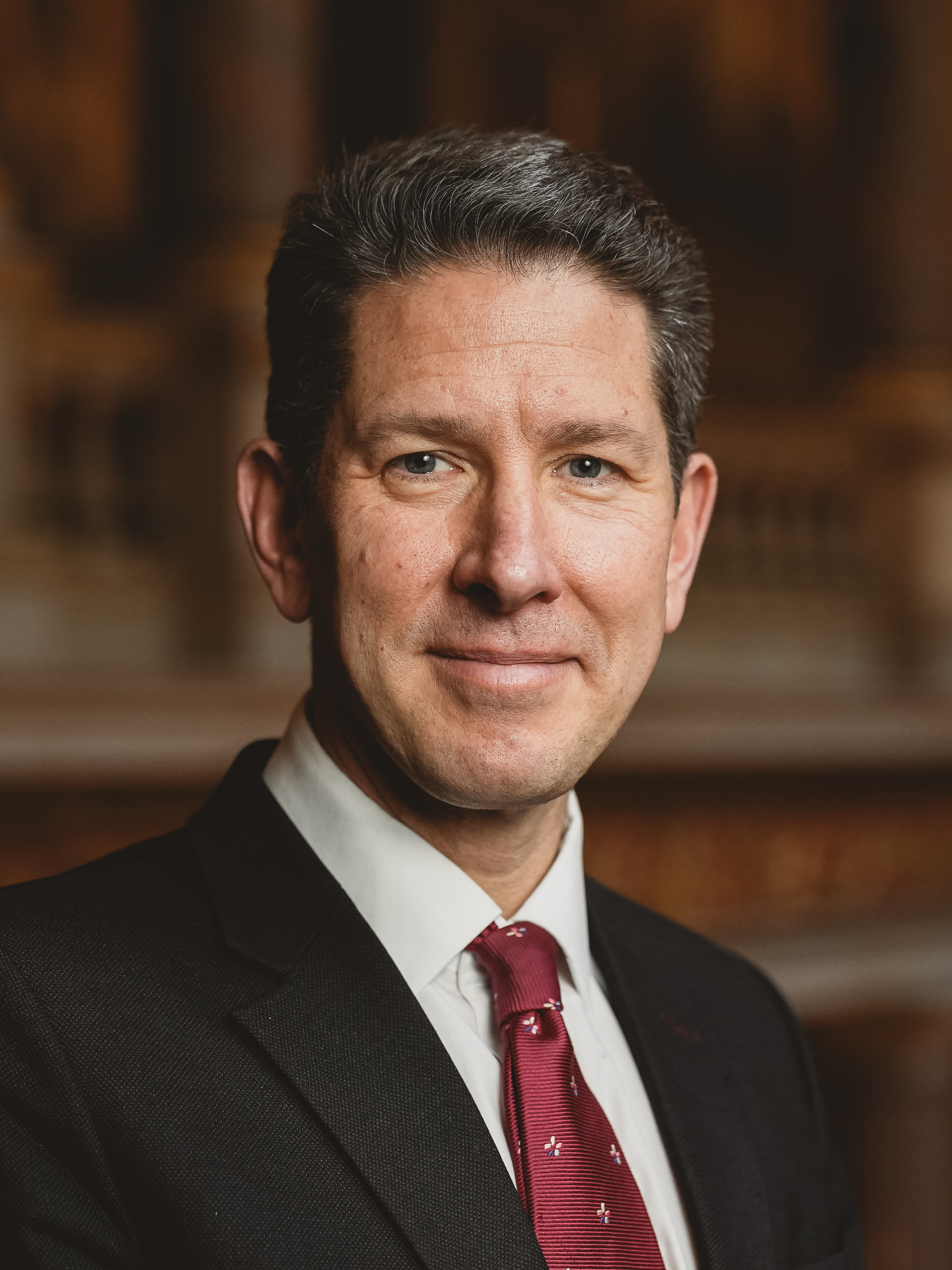
- Incumbent; Sir Christian Turner since 2 February 2026
- Foreign, Commonwealth and Development Office; British Embassy, Washington D.C.
- Style: His Excellency; Mr Ambassador
- Reports to: Foreign Secretary
- Residence: British ambassador's residence in Washington, D.C.
- Appointer: The King on advice of the prime minister
- Term length: At His Majesty's pleasure
- Inaugural holder: George Hammond; First Envoy Extraordinary to US
- Formation: 1791
- Website: British Embassy – Washington

The British ambassador to the United States is in charge of the British Embassy, Washington, D.C., the United Kingdom's diplomatic mission to the United States. The official title is His Britannic Majesty's Ambassador to the United States of America.

The ambassador's residence is on Massachusetts Avenue in Washington, D.C. It was designed by Sir Edwin Lutyens and built in 1928.

== Duties ==
The position of ambassador to the United States is considered to be one of the most important and prestigious posts in His Majesty's Diplomatic Service, along with that of Permanent Under-Secretary of State at the Foreign, Commonwealth and Development Office.

The ambassador's main duty is to present British policies to the American government and people, and to report American policies and views to the Government of the United Kingdom. They serve as the primary channel of communication between the two nations, and play an important role in treaty negotiations.

The ambassador is the head of the United Kingdom's consular service in the United States. As well as directing diplomatic activity in support of trade, they are ultimately responsible for visa services and for the provision of consular support to British citizens in America. They also oversee cultural relations between the two countries.

== History ==
The first British envoy to the United States was Sir John Temple, who was appointed consul general in 1785 and was based in New York at the estate at Richmond Hill (Manhattan) which served previously as a headquarters for George Washington.

George Hammond was appointed on 5 July 1791. He held the title of Minister in Washington or Minister to the United States of America.

In 1809, David Erskine and President James Madison negotiated a compromise on Anglo-American disputes over shipping in the Atlantic, which might have averted the War of 1812. However, the deal was rejected by King George III and the British Government recalled Erskine.

By the 1850s, the envoy's title was Her Majesty's Envoy Extraordinary and Minister Plenipotentiary to the United States of America, and the United Kingdom had consulates in several American cities. Under the direction of Sir John Crampton in 1854 and 1855, British consuls attempted to enlist American volunteers to fight in the Crimean War. The American government strenuously objected, and President Franklin Pierce asked for Crampton to be recalled. The United Kingdom refused, and in May 1856 the American government dismissed Crampton, along with the United Kingdom's consuls in New York, Philadelphia and Cincinnati. After much negotiation, the United Kingdom was allowed to re-establish its Legation in Washington the following year, and Lord Napier became the new minister.

In 1893, the British diplomatic mission in Washington was raised from a Legation to an Embassy, and Sir Julian Pauncefote, Minister since 1889, was appointed as the United Kingdom's first ambassador to the United States, with the title Her Britannic Majesty's Ambassador Extraordinary and Plenipotentiary to the United States.

The role has in the past been offered to three former Prime Ministers: the Earl of Rosebery, David Lloyd George and Sir Edward Heath, all of whom declined.

== Heads of mission ==
=== Ministers plenipotentiary (1791–1795) ===
As a republic, the United States was not entitled to receive an ambassador. Instead, the United Kingdom dispatched a diplomat with the lower rank of minister plenipotentiary. This placed the United Kingdom on equal footing with France, which also maintained a minister plenipotentiary in the United States.

1791–1795: George Hammond

=== Envoys extraordinary and ministers plenipotentiary (1796–1893) ===
In 1796, the United Kingdom raised its representation to envoy extraordinary and minister plenipotentiary, or minister. Diplomatic relations would be maintained at this rank for almost 100 years.

- 1796–1800: Sir Robert Liston
- 1800–1804: Sir Edward Thornton
- 1803–1806: Anthony Merry
- 1807–1809: The Hon. David Erskine
- 1809–1811: Francis Jackson
- 1811–1812: Sir Augustus Foster
- 1812–1815: No representation due to the War of 1812
- 1815–1820: The Hon. Sir Charles Bagot
- 1820–1824: Stratford Canning
- 1825–1835: Sir Charles Vaughan
- 1835–1843: Sir Henry Fox
- 1843–1847: Richard Pakenham
- 1849–1852: Sir Henry Bulwer
- 1852–1856: Sir John Crampton, Bt
- 1857–1858: The Lord Napier
- 1858–1865: The Lord Lyons
- 1865–1867: Sir Frederick Bruce
- 1867–1881: Sir Edward Thornton
- 1881–1888: The Hon. Lionel Sackville-West
- 1889–1893: Sir Julian Pauncefote

=== Ambassadors extraordinary and plenipotentiary (from 1893) ===
- 1893–1902: Sir Julian Pauncefote (Lord Pauncefote from 1899)
- 1902–1903: The Hon. Sir Michael Herbert
- 1903–1906: Sir Mortimer Durand
- 1907–1913: James Bryce
- 1913–1918: Sir Cecil Spring Rice
- 1918–1919: The Earl of Reading
- 1919–1920: The Viscount Grey of Fallodon
- 1920–1924: Sir Auckland Geddes
- 1924–1930: Sir Esme Howard
- 1930–1939: Sir Ronald Lindsay
- 1939–1940: The Marquess of Lothian
- 1940–1946: The Viscount Halifax (The Earl of Halifax from 1944)
- 1946–1948: The Lord Inverchapel
- 1948–1952: Sir Oliver Franks
- 1953–1956: Sir Roger Makins
- 1956–1961: Sir Harold Caccia
- 1961–1965: The Hon. Sir David Ormsby-Gore (Lord Harlech from 1964)
- 1965–1969: Sir Patrick Dean
- 1969–1971: The Rt. Hon. John Freeman
- 1971–1974: The Earl of Cromer
- 1974–1977: The Hon. Sir Peter Ramsbotham
- 1977–1979: The Hon. Peter Jay
- 1979–1982: Sir Nicholas Henderson
- 1982–1986: Sir Oliver Wright
- 1986–1991: Sir Antony Acland
- 1991–1995: Sir Robin Renwick
- 1995–1997: Sir John Kerr
- 1997–2003: Sir Christopher Meyer
- 2003–2007: Sir David Manning
- 2007–2012: Sir Nigel Sheinwald
- 2012: Sir Philip Barton, Chargé d'affaires ad interim
- 2012–2016: Sir Peter Westmacott
- 2016–2019: Sir Kim Darroch (The Lord Darroch of Kew from 2019)
- 2020: Michael Tatham, Chargé d'affaires ad interim
- 2020–2025: Dame Karen Pierce
- 2025: James Roscoe, Chargé d'affaires ad interim
- 2025: The Lord Mandelson
- 2025–2026: James Roscoe, Chargé d'affaires ad interim
- 2026–present: Sir Christian Turner

== See also ==
- United States ambassador to the United Kingdom
- Canadian ambassadors to the United States – replacing the role of the British Ambassador to the US (and Foreign Secretary of State for the Colonies) in dealing with diplomatic relations for Canada after 1926
