= Henry Stephen Fox =

British diplomat

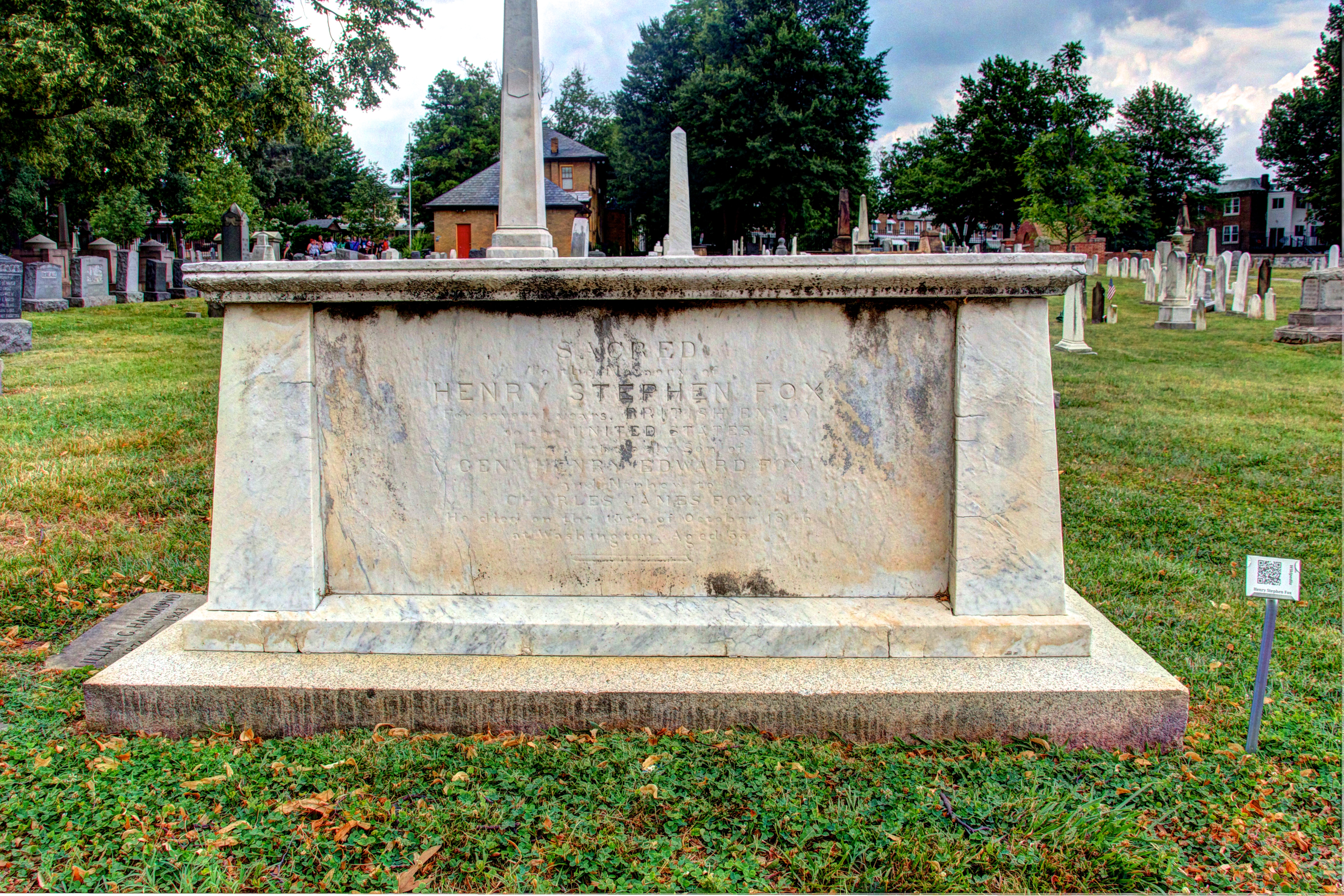
Henry Fox's grave at the Congressional Cemetery

Henry Stephen Fox (22 September 1791 – 13 October 1846) was a British diplomat. He was the son of Henry Edward Fox, and the paternal grandson of Caroline Fox, 1st Baroness of Holland.

== Life ==
Born in Chatham, the only son of General Henry Edward Fox (1755–1811), Henry was educated at Eton College. He matriculated at Christ Church, Oxford in 1809.

Fox's wit, charm, love of gambling (shared by his uncle Charles James Fox) and manners made him popular in fashionable circles. He also shared his uncle's Whig views and served as attaché with the mission to the Sicilian court (1814–1818) and then with the French mission (1818–1824). In the latter he was arrested for debt and only the French government's intervention got him released. He next served as secretary of legation at Turin (1824), chargé d'affaires at Turin (1824–25), secretary of the legation at Naples (1826–27) and chargé d'affaires at Naples (1827–28).

He was gazetted secretary of legation at Vienna in 1828, but refused this appointment to become first minister-plenipotentiary and envoy-extraordinary at Buenos Aires then Rio de Janeiro (with the civil war delaying his departure until 1831). He was there from 1831 to 1836, when he moved to be British ambassador to the United States of America, in the midst of disputes over slavery and Canada that seemed likely to lead to war. Fox did not enjoy his American posting and became more and more reclusive (though he did take up botanical collecting), but he still objected to Robert Peel's government sending Lord Ashburton to settle the north-eastern boundary dispute over Fox's head. He was retired from the post in 1843 to clear the way to a successful treaty to solve the Oregon dispute. He stayed on in Washington, where he died from a drug overdose of unspecified pills in 1846 and was buried in the Congressional Cemetery, passing his botanical collection to his nephew Sir Charles James Fox Bunbury.

Diplomatic posts
Preceded by Charles Richard Vaughan	British Ambassador to the United States; 1836–1843	Succeeded by Richard Pakenham
