= Navy Island =

Uninhabited island in the Niagara River

Coordinates: 43.056°N 79.010°W

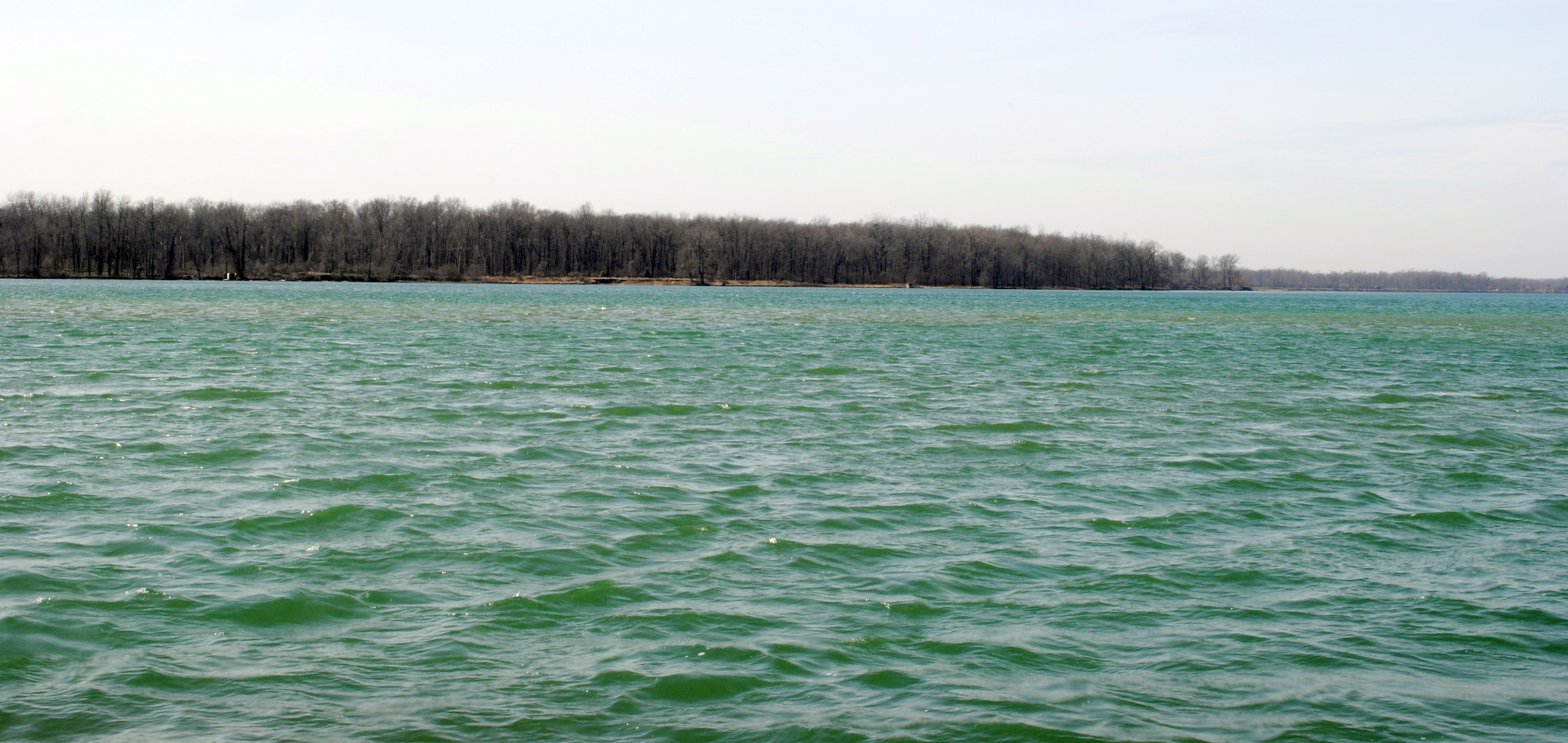
- Navy Island from Buckhorn Island State Park in 2012

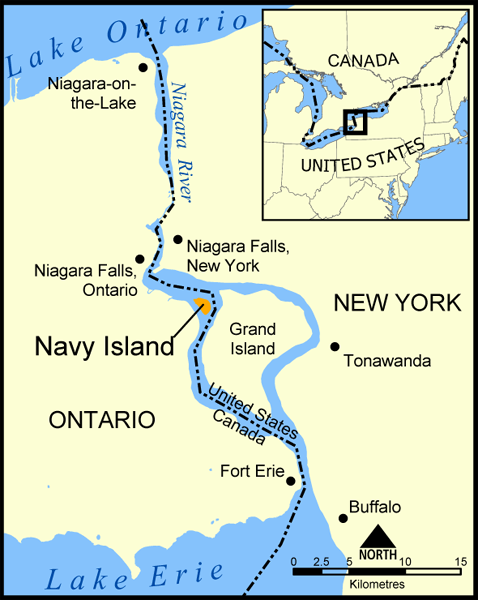

Geography
- Location: Niagara River
- Area: 1.2 km^{2} (0.46 sq mi)

Administration
- Canada
- Province: Ontario

National Historic Site of Canada
- Designated: 1921

Navy Island (Seneca: Gaöwö'go:wa:h) is a small, uninhabited island in the Niagara River in the province of Ontario, managed by Parks Canada as a National Historic Site of Canada. It is located about 4.5 kilometres (2+^{3}/_{4} miles) upstream from Horseshoe Falls, and has an area of roughly 1.2 km^{2} (^{7}/_{16} sq mi). It is across from the town of Grand Island, New York, US. It was designated a national historic site in 1921 in recognition of its role in shipbuilding and the location of the short-lived Republic of Canada. The island is the only island in the Niagara River located within Canadian territory and is the second largest Island in the Niagara River. The site is closed to the public, has no visitor facilities, and has not allowed camping since the expiration of a lease with the Niagara Parks Commission.

== History ==
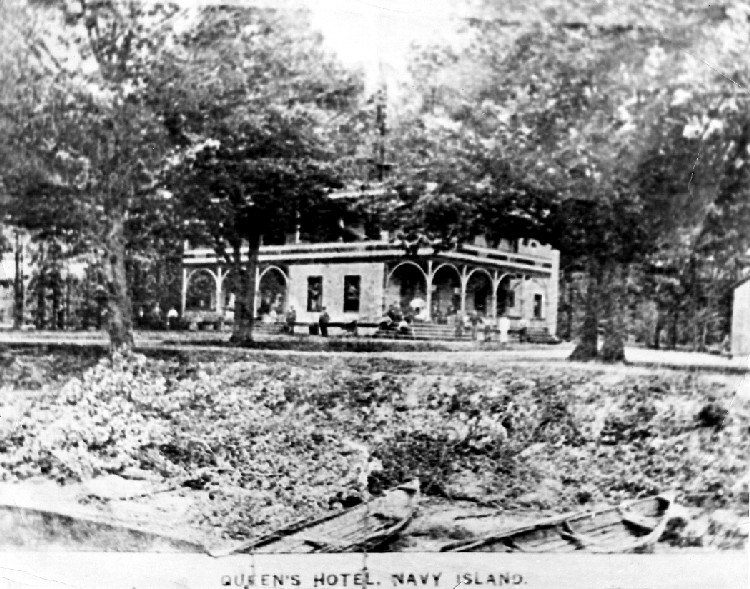
Queen's Hotel

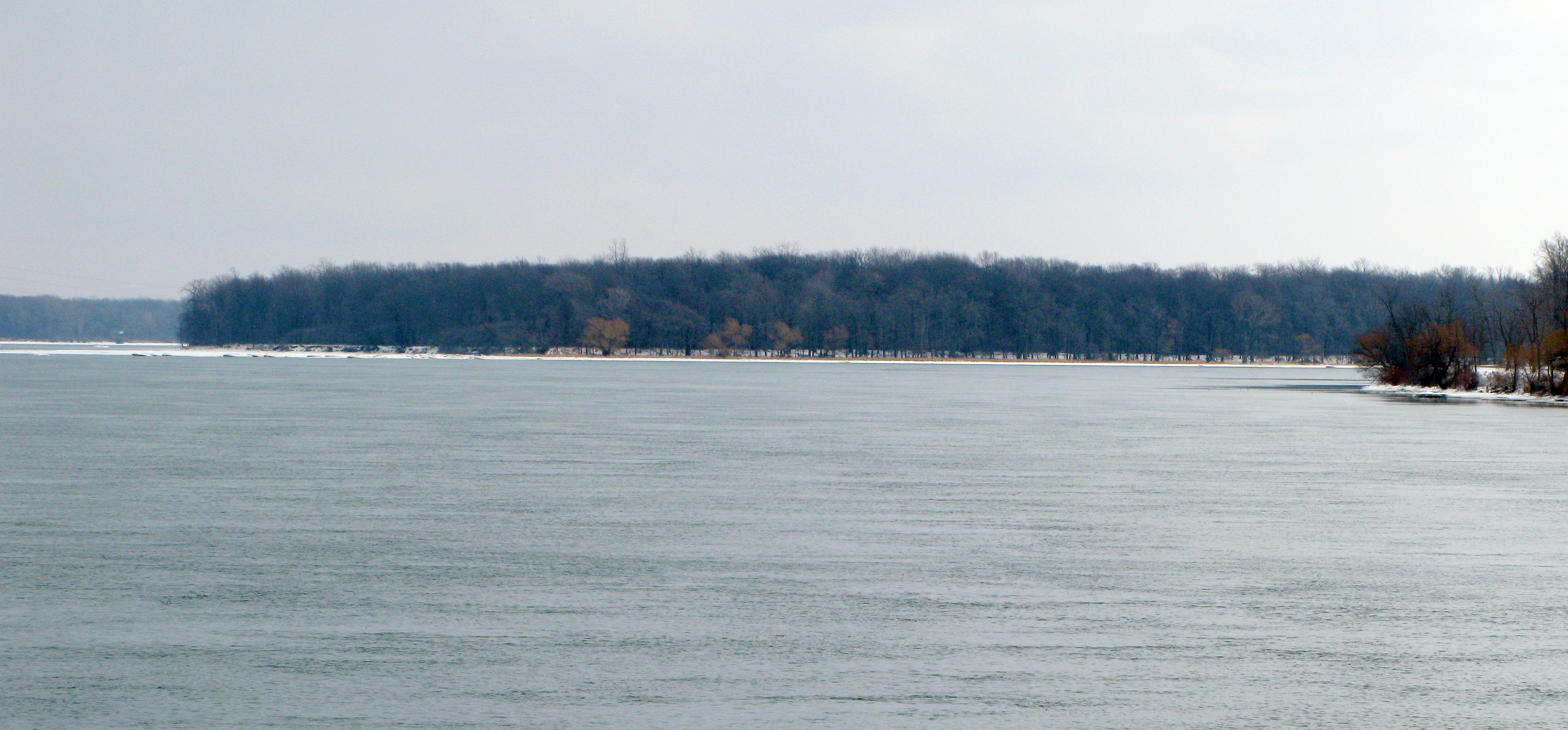
Navy Island in winter from Ontario shore

Navy Island was formed 10,000–12,000 years ago by the Wisconsin glaciation. The recession of the ice sheets in the area led to the formation of the Niagara River and the islands within it. Navy Island at the time was 316 acres (1.28 km^{2}).

Navy Island was settled by the Lamoka people of the late Archaic period, in approximately 2000 BC, and later by the Meadowood culture peoples in 1000 BC. Archaeological excavations have revealed a native peoples burial site, along with their arrowheads and scrapers on the shores of the island. The Seneca people know Navy Island as Gaöwö'go:wa:h.

During the French colonization of New France, Navy Island was known as Île de la Marina. Here or nearby the French built four ships (bateaux) that they used to service the Great Lakes. Two of these vessels were burnt by the French on Grand Island in 1759. When New France was ceded to the British in 1763, the latter set up the Navy Island Royal Naval Shipyard here. This is where the first naval vessels to sail the Upper Great Lakes were constructed and where the island derives its name from. In the War of 1812, a detachment of the Provincial Marine was stationed on the island with a blockhouse and storehouse built on the southwest side of the island. The shipyard ceased operations around 1813, but was not transferred to Canada (Upper Canada) until 1822.

In 1837, William Lyon Mackenzie and about 200 of his supporters captured the island and proclaimed the Republic of Canada there. The old blockhouse was occupied by the rebel forces. Initially Mackenzie started with twenty-five men, but the population eventually swelled to over six hundred men. On January 11, 1838, the rebels were forced from the island and retreated across the river into the United States.

In the mid 1850's, much of the forest covering the island was cleared for farming. By 1865 there were four families living on the island.

In 1875, the Queens Hotel was established as a popular summer resort on the island's south side. It was destroyed by fire in 1910.

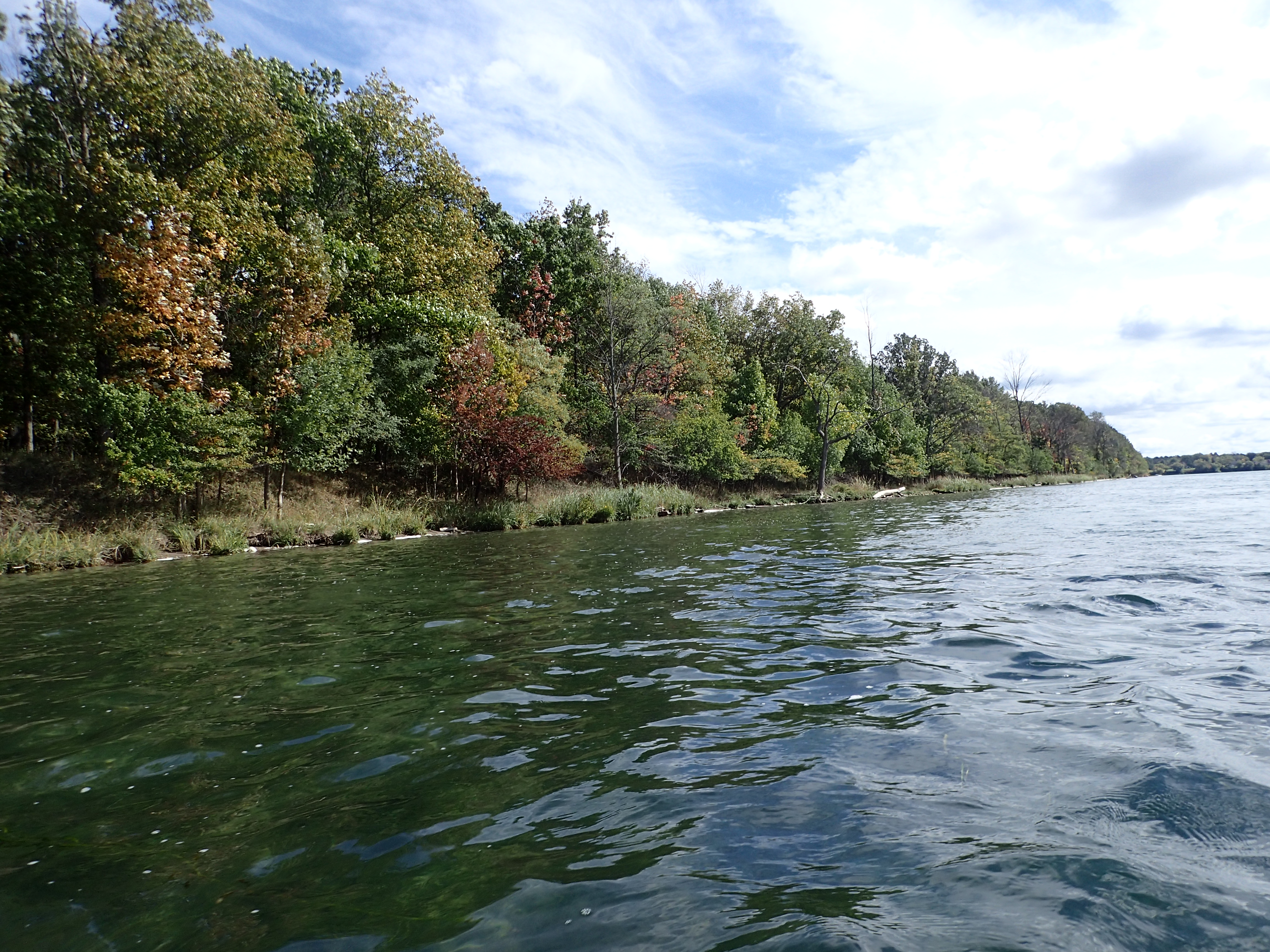
Shore of Navy Island

== Physical properties ==
Farms and orchards were located on the northeast, south, central, northwest, and southwest ends of the island. Since abandoned, most of the farmed lands have been re-forested. Most trees on the island are oak or hickory. There are some reminders of habitation on the south side. A pier still exists that once served boaters to the island.

The Island is federal crown land but has been controlled by the Niagara Parks Commission since 1938. Permits were needed for camping, but camping has since been prohibited. A commemorative plaque for the island is located on the south shore of the Niagara River.

Access to the island is closed to the general public and used only by Parks Canada staff since a lease with the Niagara Parks Commission expired.

There is a large population of deer who live on the island.

== Proposal for United Nations headquarters and QEW expansion ==
Navy Island was proposed to be the new World Peace Capital and headquarters of the United Nations by an international committee in 1945 and 1946. The island was considered to be an ideal location as it lay on the boundary between two peaceful countries. An artist's rendering of the World Peace Capital showed the property with bridges spanning both countries (at Grand Island in the US and the Canadian mainland on the other side). It was proposed that Navy Island would be ceded to the United Nations as long as the headquarters remained, and to revert to the Canadian government should the U.N. move. The proposal was ultimately turned down in favour of the current U.N. headquarters in New York City.

The Island was considered as a location for a new highway route from Grand Island on the US side of the Niagara to the Queen Elizabeth Way in Canada, but the project was ultimately scrapped.
