= Owego (village), New York =

Village in Tioga County, New York, US

Owego
- Village
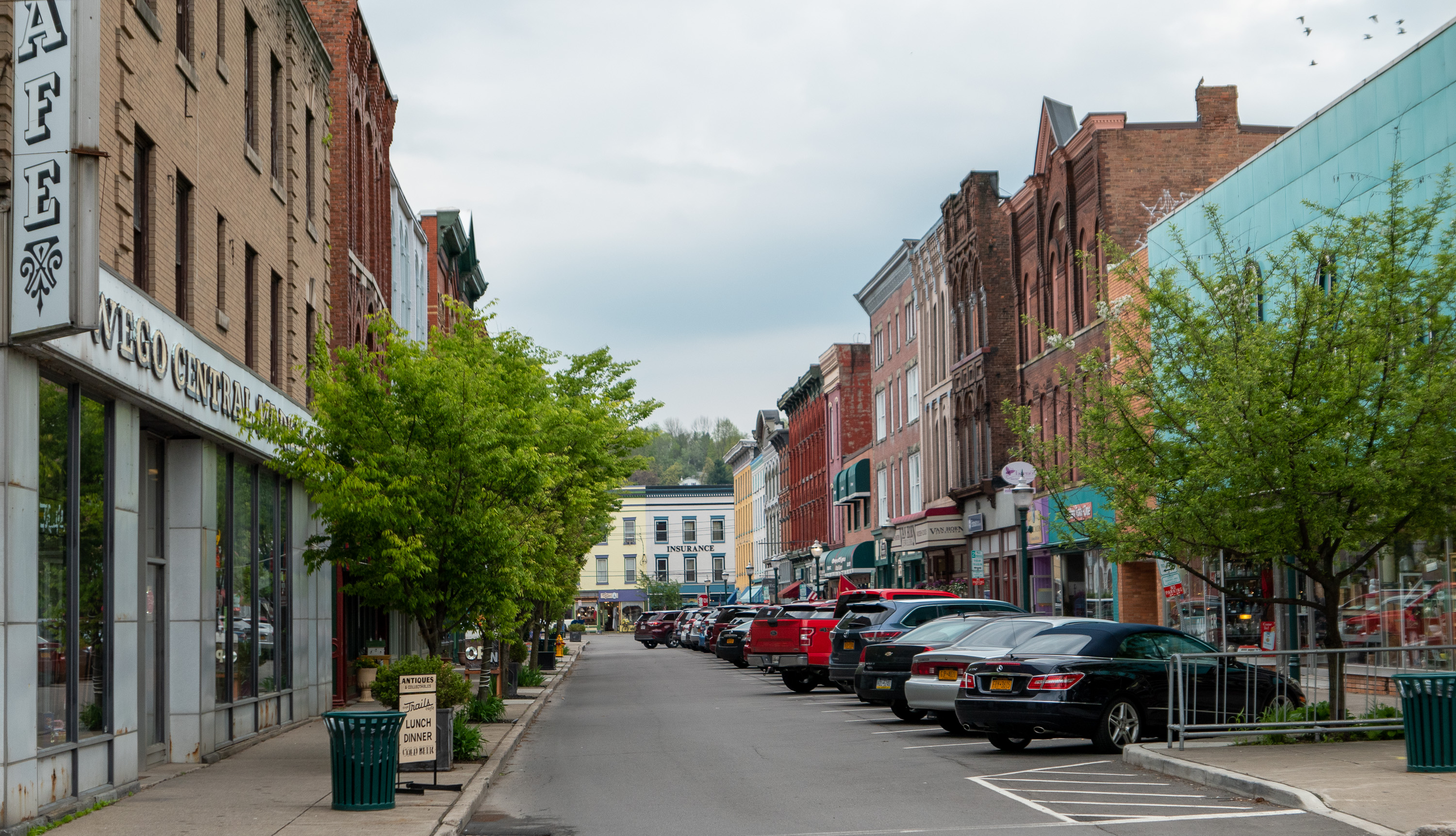
- Lake Street in downtown Owego

- Location within the state of New York Owego (the United States)
- Coordinates: 42°6′16″N 76°15′48″W
- Country: United States
- State: New York
- County: Tioga
- Settled: 1785
- Incorporated: April 4, 1827
- Named for: Unami language word meaning "where the valley widens"

Area
  - Total: 2.78 sq mi (7.20 km^{2})
  - Land: 2.55 sq mi (6.60 km^{2})
  - Water: 0.23 sq mi (0.60 km^{2})
- Elevation: 814 ft (248 m)

Population (2020)
  - Total: 3,654
  - Density: 1,434.0/sq mi (553.68/km^{2})
- Time zone: UTC-5 (Eastern (EST))
  - Summer (DST): UTC-4 (EDT)
- ZIP code: 13827
- Area code: 607
- FIPS code: 36-55882
- GNIS feature ID: 0959672
- Website: villageofowegony.gov

Owego is a village in and the county seat of Tioga County, New York, United States. The population was 3,896 at the 2010 census. It is part of the Binghamton metropolitan area. The name is derived from the Iroquois word Ahwaga, meaning where the valley widens.

The Village of Owego is by the west town line of the Town of Owego and is west of Binghamton, New York.

Owego is one of only twelve villages in New York still incorporated under a charter; all other New York villages have incorporated or re-incorporated under the provisions of Village Law.

== History ==
The village of Owego was established in 1787. When the "Town of Tioga" was created from the Town of Union, Owego village was in Tioga. In 1813, Tioga and Owego switched names, putting the village in the same-named town. The current Town of Tioga is now just west of the village. The village is in the Owego-Apalachin Central School District. Five district buildings are within the village's limits: the district office building, the Owego Elementary School, the combined Owego-Apalachin Middle School and Owego Free Academy building, the district's bus garage, and the district's central maintenance facility, all on or just off of Sheldon Guile Boulevard. Several former school buildings throughout the village have been repurposed for other uses.

On September 27, 1849, a large conflagration now known as "The Great Fire of Owego" began in the Temperance Hall of the Ely building. 104 buildings within the business district were completely burned to the ground.

The Evergreen Cemetery, St. Paul's Church, Owego Central Historic District, Tioga County Courthouse, and United States Post Office are listed on the National Register of Historic Places. The James C. Beecher House was listed in 2012.

== Geography ==
According to the United States Census Bureau, the village has a total area of 2.7 square miles (7.0 km^{2}), of which, 2.5 square miles (6.5 km^{2}) of it is land and 0.2 square miles (0.6 km^{2}) of it (8.12%) is water.

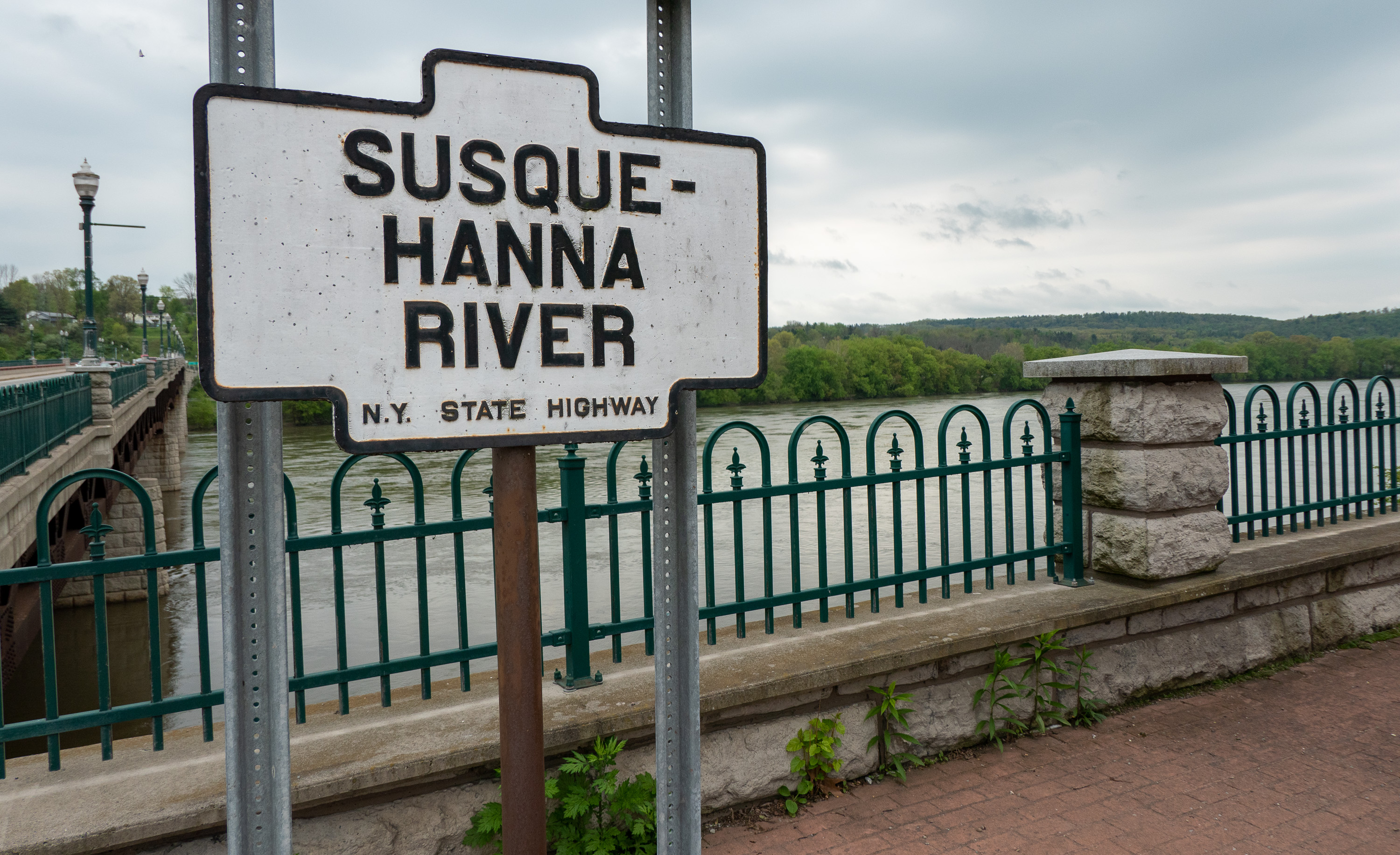
The Susquehanna River in Owego

Owego is on the Susquehanna River where the Owego Creek flows into the Susquehanna from the north.

A bridge connects the village to the Southern Tier Expressway (New York State Route 17), which is on the south side of the river. Owego is located on NY-17C, south of the junction of NY-96 and NY-38.

== Demographics ==
Historical population
Census	Pop.	Note	%±
1870	4,756		—
1880	5,525		16.2%
1900	5,039		—
1910	4,633		−8.1%
1920	4,147		−10.5%
1930	4,742		14.3%
1940	5,068		6.9%
1950	5,350		5.6%
1960	5,417		1.3%
1970	5,152		−4.9%
1980	4,364		−15.3%
1990	4,442		1.8%
2000	3,911		−12.0%
2010	3,896		−0.4%
2020	3,654		−6.2%
U.S. Decennial Census

As of the census of 2000, there were 3,911 people, 1,664 households, and 978 families residing in the village. The population density was 1,566.7 inhabitants per square mile (604.9/km^{2}). There were 1,913 housing units at an average density of 766.3 per square mile (295.9/km^{2}). The racial makeup of the village was 95.42% White, 1.15% Black or African American, 0.46% Native American, 1.02% Asian, 0.33% from other races, and 1.61% from two or more races. Hispanic or Latino of any race were 1.82% of the population.

There were 1,664 households, out of which 27.7% had children under the age of 18 living with them, 42.5% were married couples living together, 13.1% had a female householder with no husband present, and 41.2% were non-families. 35.2% of all households were made up of individuals, and 13.4% had someone living alone who was 65 years of age or older. The average household size was 2.29 and the average family size was 2.95.

In the village, the population was spread out, with 23.3% under the age of 18, 9.0% from 18 to 24, 28.2% from 25 to 44, 22.0% from 45 to 64, and 17.4% who were 65 years of age or older. The median age was 38 years. For every 100 females, there were 94.1 males. For every 100 females age 18 and over, there were 88.9 males.

The median income for a household in the village was $31,742, and the median income for a family was $43,139. Males had a median income of $27,299 versus $20,268 for females. The per capita income for the village was $17,068. About 10.3% of families and 13.9% of the population were below the poverty line, including 19.0% of those under age 18 and 4.8% of those aged 65 or over.

== Local government ==
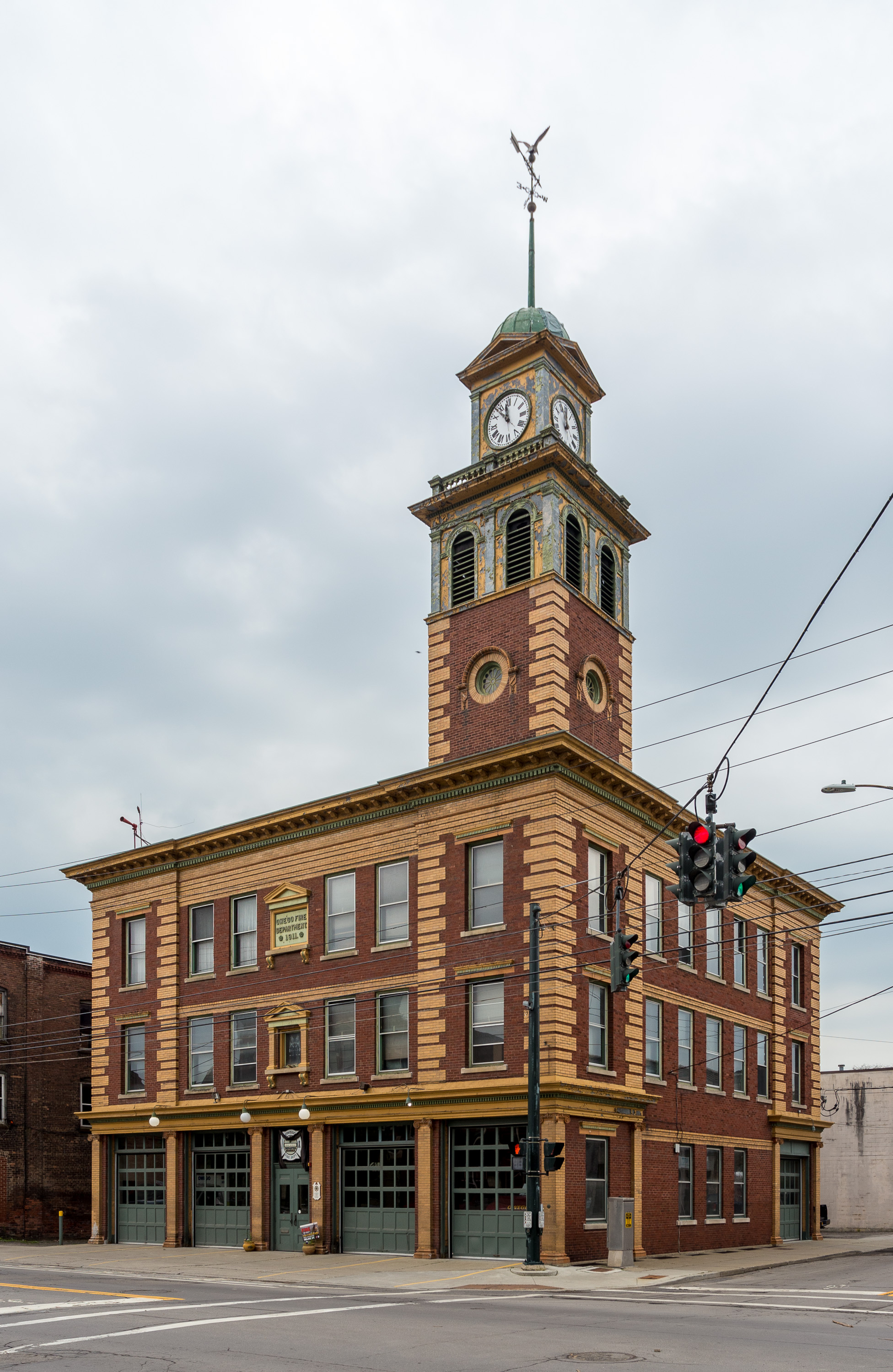
Owego's historic Central Fire Station

The Village of Owego is governed by a Board of Trustees, which is composed of the Mayor and six Trustees. Each member serves staggered two-year terms in a part-time capacity.

The Owego Fire Department was founded in August 1828. The all-volunteer organization is made up of five companies in four stations.

== Education ==
The CDP is in the Owego Apalachin Central School District.

== Reputation ==
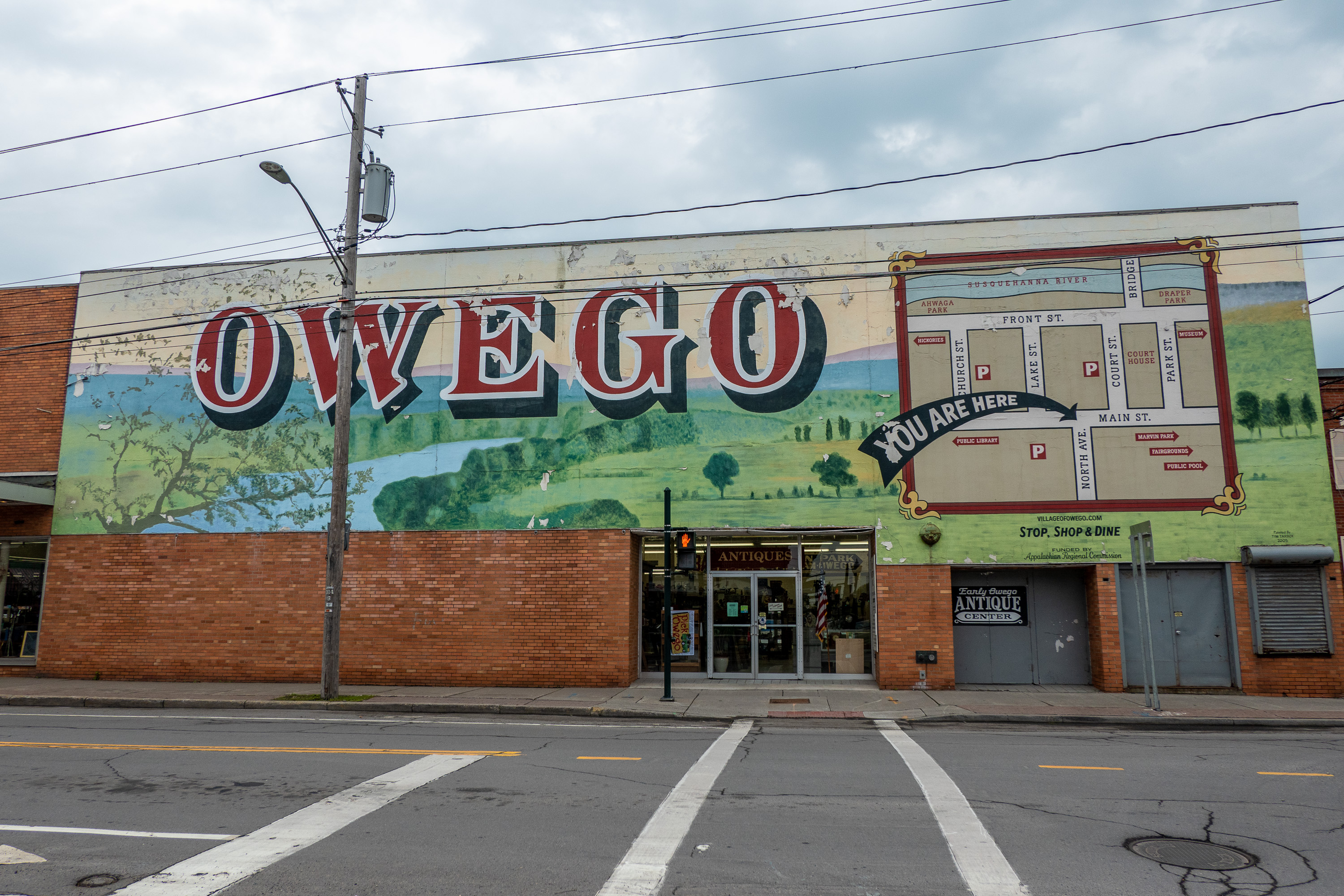
Mural welcoming visitors to Owego

Owego was named by Budget Travel magazine's readers as The Coolest Small Town in the United States in a poll. Results were announced on The Early Show, April 15, 2009, with Budget Travel's editor in chief, Nina Willdorf with Harry Smith.

== Strawberry Festival ==
The Village of Owego is home to a popular annual strawberry festival which has occurred every year in June since 1980 (excepting 2020 and 2021). The festival regularly draws 20,000 visitors and includes a parade, community 5k run, live music and vendors of fresh produce and prepared strawberry based dishes. 2020 would mark the 40th anniversary of the festival, however, the COVID-19 pandemic forced its cancellation. As such, the 40th anniversary observance occurred in 2022.

== Notable people ==
- Austin Blair, 1818–1894. Politician, serving in the 40th, 41st, and 42nd U.S. Congress in the House of Representatives from 1867–1873 for Michigan's 3rd district. 13th governor of Michigan, 1861–1865. Practiced law in Owego.
- Isaac S. Catlin, 1835–1916. lawyer, Brevetted Major General in the Union Army. Awarded the Medal of Honor for his efforts in the Battle of the Crater in Petersburg, Virginia. Born and practiced law in Owego.
- Daniel Cruger, 1780–1843. Soldier, newspaper publisher, lawyer, state and national politician. As a member of the Democratic-Republican party he was elected to the U.S. House of Representatives, 1817–1819 for New York's 20th district. 15th United States Congress.
- Amasa Dana, 1792–1867. Studied and practiced law in Owego. Later, as a Democratic Party (United States) politician, he would serve New York's 26th and 22nd districts in the 26th United States Congress and the 28th United States Congress.
- John R. Drake, 1782–1857. Local, state, and national politician. The First Judge of the Broome County Court. As a member of the Democratic-Republican party he was elected to the U.S. House of Representatives, 1817–1819 for New York's 15th district, serving simultaneously with fellow Owegan Daniel Cruger in the 15th United States Congress.
- Washington Gladden, 1836–1918. Leading American Congregational Pastor and pioneer of the Progressive Era-Social Gospel Movement. Educated and lived in Owego.
- Douglas G. Hurley, born 1966. Is an American engineer, United States Marine Corps Naval Aviator, and NASA astronaut. He was also the first Marine to fly the F/A-18 E/F Super Hornet. He is a pilot in the Space Shuttle program. Hurley attended Owego Free Academy.
- Mame Stewart Josenberger, 1868–1964. African American educator, businesswoman and clubwoman that was born and raised in the village.
- Helen Dean King, 1869–1955. Celebrated biologist, professor, author. One of Dr. King's crowning achievements was the breeding of the Wistar rat which would greatly facilitate the future of biological, genetic, and medical research. In 1932, King was awarded the Richards Research prize, also known as the Women’s Nobel. Born in Owego.
- Thomas Le Clear, 1818–1882. Famous visual artist. Le Clear is known for his portraits of Edwin Booth-as Hamlet, Presidents: Millard Fillmore, U.S Grant, and his genre scenes including Interior with Portraits. Born in the Town of Owego, he taught painting at the Owego Female Institute in 1844. Moving to New York City he was elected to full membership in the National Academy of Design in 1863. He was one of the most prominent portrait painters on the East Coast.
- Osmund A. Leahy, 1915–1989. Major General United States Army. 1940 graduate of the United States Military Academy. Awarded three Silver Star medals during the Second World War. Resident of Owego.
- Stephen B. Leonard, 1793–1876. Local publisher, politician, and postmaster. Elected as a Democrat to the 24th and the 26th United States Congress. He represented New York's 22nd congressional district in the U.S. House of Representatives. Lived in Owego.
- Belva Ann Lockwood, 1830–1917, Attorney, politician, educator, author, and National Equal Rights Party U.S. presidential candidate (first woman to run for president – 1884), headed a girls' seminary in Owego for three years in the 1860s. Around this time she met Susan B. Anthony; nearby Lockwood is named for her.
- John Alden Loring, 1871–1947. Noted mammalogist and field naturalist. He served on the Smithsonian-Roosevelt African Expedition (1909–1910). Born and lived in Owego.
- Daniel McCallum, 1815–1878, American railroad engineer, general manager of the New York and Erie Railroad and Union Brevet Major General during the American Civil War, known as one of the early pioneers of management. Lived in Owego.
- John M. Parker (New York politician), 1805–1873. Justice who served on the New State Supreme Court and Court of Appeals. Former U.S. Congressman elected as an Opposition Party candidate in the 34th, and a Republican in the 35th United States Congress serving New York's 27th congressional district.
- Thomas C. Platt, politician. A two-term member of the U.S. House of Representatives (1873–1877) and a three-term U.S. Senator from New York in the years 1881 and 1897–1909. He is best known as the "political boss" of the Republican Party in New York State. Born and lived in Owego.
- Darryl Ponicsan, born 1938. American author and screenwriter. Taught high school English in Owego.
- Raphael Pumpelly, 1837–1923. World renowned American geologist and explorer. Born in Owego.
- George Raymond Sr. 1890–1967 grew up on McMaster street in the village, founder of the Raymond Corporation headquartered in Greene, NY
- Henry Martyn Robert, 1837–1923. Brigadier General in the U.S. Army, engineer, and author. In 1876, Robert published the first edition of his manual of parliamentary procedure, Robert's Rules of Order, which remains today the most common parliamentary authority in the United States.
- Howard W. Robison, 1915–1987. Republican politician elected to the United States House of Representatives serving the 37th, 33rd, and 27th districts of New York State from 1958 to 1975. Robison was born in Owego and is buried in Evergreen Cemetery (Owego, New York).
- John D. Rockefeller, 1839–1937. American oil industry business magnate, industrialist, and philanthropist lived in the Owego, NY area as a young child and attended the Owego Free Academy. He is widely considered the wealthiest American of all time, and the richest person in modern history.
- Richard Stout, 1836–1896. Union Navy sailor during the American Civil War. Recipient of the United States military's highest decoration-the Medal of Honor for his actions while serving on the USS Isaac Smith in an engagement with Confederate forces on the Stono River in South Carolina. Born, lived, and interred in Owego.
- John J. Taylor, 1808–1892. Lawyer, banker, state and local Democratic politician, U.S. Congressman elected to the 33rd United States Congress serving New York's 27th congressional district.
- Benjamin Franklin Tracy, 1830–1915. Brigadier General in the U.S. Army-Medal of Honor winner. Lawyer, state politician, 32nd United States Secretary of the Navy. Considered the 'Father' of the modern American two ocean fighting Navy. Was educated and practiced law in the Village of Owego.
- Gilbert Carlton Walker, 1833–1885. Lawyer, banker, politician. Served as the 36th governor of Virginia – 1869–1874, first as a provisional Republican then as a Democrat. He also served as a Democratic in the Forty-fourth and Forty-fifth U.S. Congresses. He practiced law in Owego.
- Nathaniel Parker Willis, 1806–1867. Nationally known author, poet, and editor, lived at his estate Glenmary (namesake of Glen Mary Drive), from 1837 to 1842, in the town just outside the present village. Founder of Town and Country (magazine). Lived on the border of the Village of Owego.
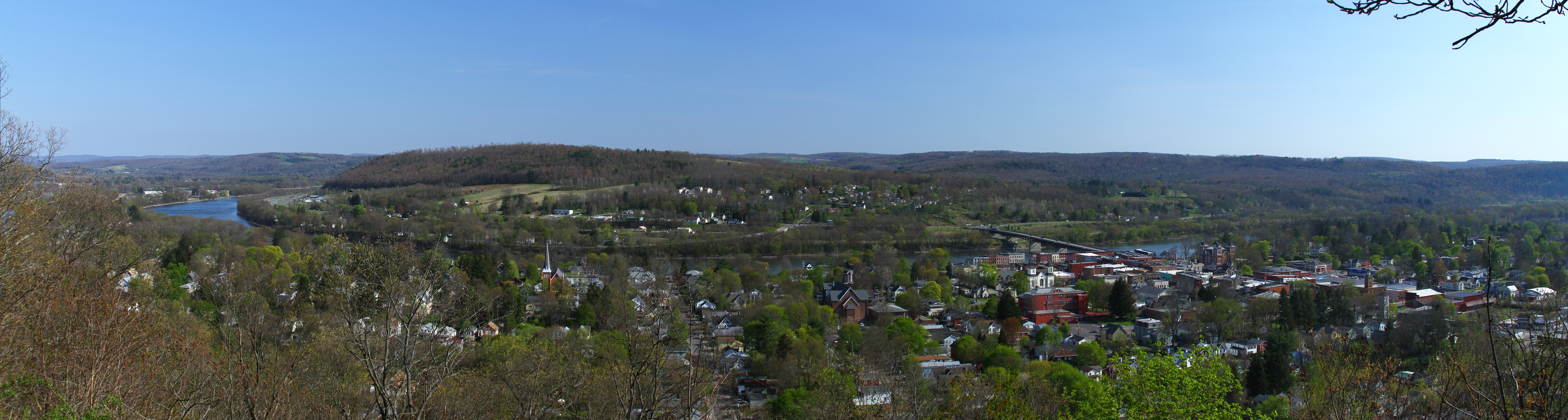
Village of Owego
