= Sidway =

Sidway is a surname of English origin. Notable people with the surname include:

- Frank St. John Sidway (1869–1938), American lawyer and National Guard leader
- Franklin Sidway (1834–1920), American businessman and banker

== See also ==
- Maney-Sidway House, historic house in Franklin, Tennessee, U.S.
- Hamer v. Sidway
