= Solomon G. Haven =

American politician

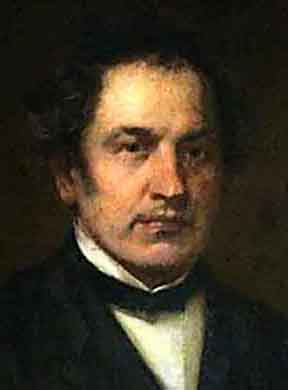

16th Mayor of Buffalo
- In office 1846–1847
- Preceded by: Joseph G. Masten
- Succeeded by: Elbridge G. Spaulding

U.S. House of Representatives, New York's 32nd congressional district
- In office March 4, 1851 – March 3, 1857
- Preceded by: Elbridge G. Spaulding
- Succeeded by: Israel T. Hatch

Personal details
- Born: November 27, 1810 Guilford, New York
- Died: December 24, 1861 (aged 51) Buffalo, New York
- Party: Whig
- Spouse: Harriett N. Scott
- Children: 4

Solomon George Haven (November 27, 1810 – December 24, 1861) was a U.S. representative from New York and mayor of Buffalo, New York, serving in 1846–1847.

== Biography ==
He was born in Guilford, New York on November 27, 1810. He taught school and studied law and on January 10, 1835, moved to Buffalo and finished his studies in the law offices of Fillmore & Hall, the partnership of Millard Fillmore and Nathan K. Hall, later becoming a partner. On May 2, 1838, Haven married Harriett N. Scott. In 1843 he was appointed district attorney of Erie County.

On March 3, 1846, he was elected mayor of Buffalo. During his term, the city charter was amended to give the mayor veto power and the Buffalo Commercial Advertiser was designated as the newspaper of the city. On March 9, 1847, Haven's term as mayor ended.

Haven was elected as a Whig to the Thirty-second and Thirty-third Congresses, and reelected to the Thirty-fourth Congress (March 4, 1851 – March 3, 1857).

He was an unsuccessful candidate for reelection in 1856 to the Thirty-fifth Congress and for election in 1860 to the Thirty-seventh Congress. He engaged in the practice of his profession until his death in Buffalo, New York, December 24, 1861. He was interred in Forest Lawn Cemetery.

Political offices
Preceded by William Ketchum	Mayor of Buffalo, NY; 1846–1847	Succeeded by Elbridge G. Spaulding
U.S. House of Representatives
Preceded by Elbridge G. Spaulding	Member of the U.S. House of Representatives from New York's 32nd congressional district 1851–1857	Succeeded by Israel T. Hatch
