= Siddoway =

Siddoway is a surname of English origin. Notable people with the surname include:

- Jeff Siddoway (born 1948), American politician
- Richard M. Siddoway (born 1940), American author and politician

== See also ==
- Sidway, another surname
