= Owego Central Historic District =

Historic district in New York, United States

- U.S. National Register of Historic Places
- U.S. Historic district
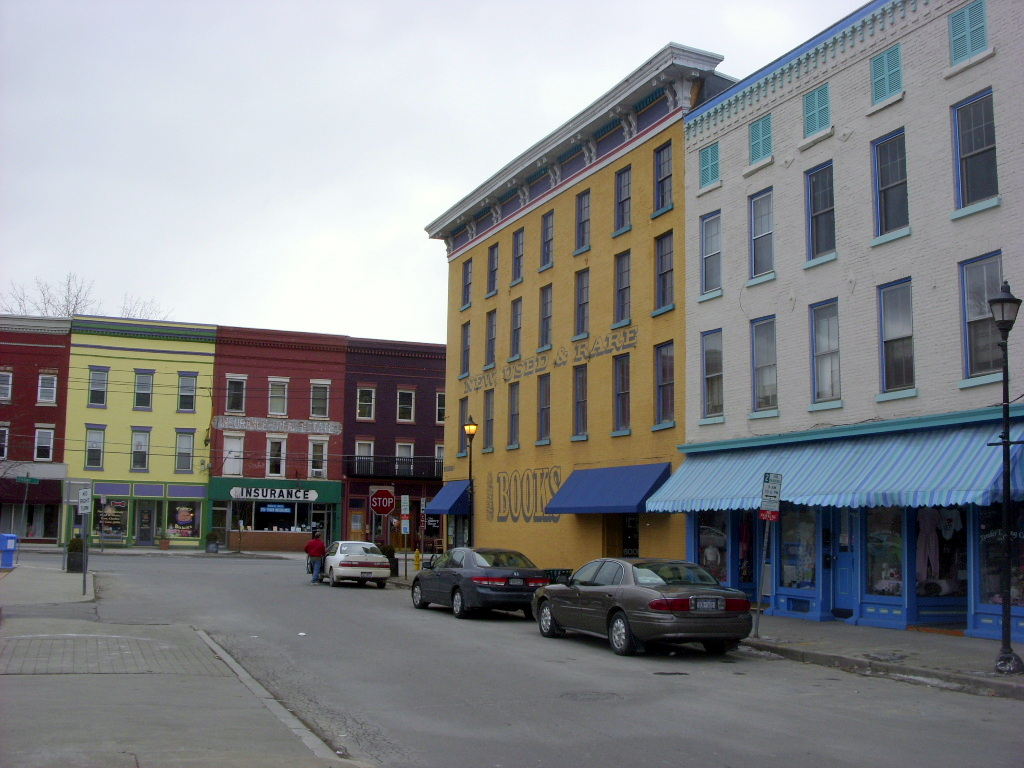
- Riverow, February 2009

- Location within New York Location within the United States
- Location: North Ave., Park, Main, Lake, Court, and Fronts Sts., (original); Roughly bounded by William St., Central Ave., Chestnut St., Fifth Ave., and Susquehanna R., (increase)Owego, New York
- Coordinates: 42°6′6″N 76°15′40″W
- Built: 1840
- Architect: Abner Beers (increase)
- Architectural style: Beaux Arts, Italianate, Federal (original); Greek Revival, Gothic, Italianate (increase)
- NRHP reference No.: 80002780 (original); 98000353 (increase)
- Added to NRHP: December 3, 1980 (original); April 08, 1998 (increase)

Owego Central Historic District is a historic district in Owego in Tioga County, New York. It encompasses 83 contributing buildings, 1 contributing site, and 1 contributing structure. The district is primarily commercial, with some notable civic and institutional buildings. Notable buildings include the former Owego Academy (1828), County Clerk's Office, Owego Village Firehouse (1911), Owego National Bank (1913), Presbyterian Church, and the Greek Revival and Italianate style Riverow commercial complex. It was listed on the National Register of Historic Places in 1980 and its boundaries were increased in 1998.

The district includes Tioga County Courthouse and U.S. Post Office (Owego, New York), which are separately listed on the National Register.
