= Evergreen Cemetery (Owego, New York) =

Historic cemetery in New York, United States

- U.S. National Register of Historic Places
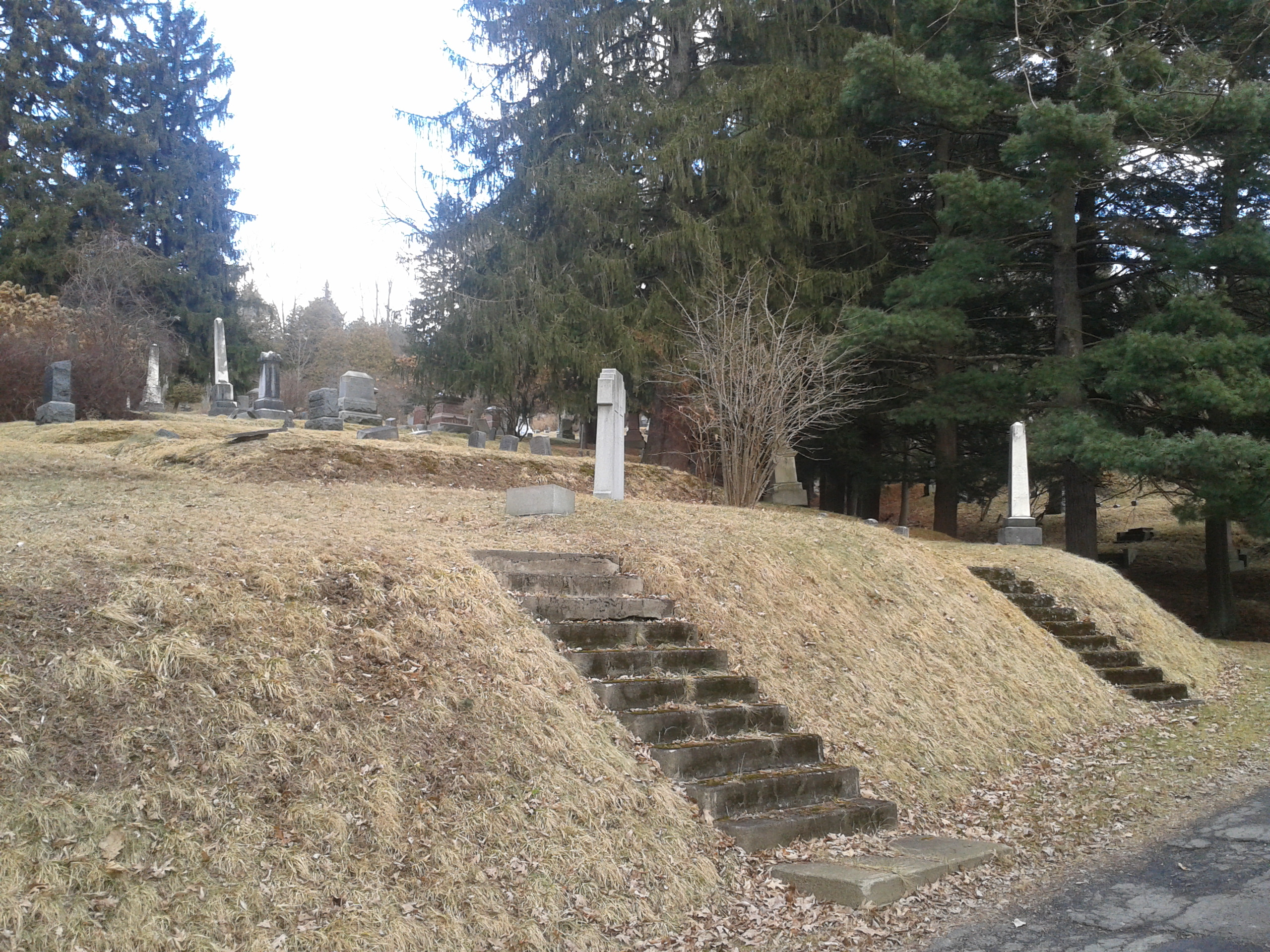
- Evergreen Cemetery, February 2012

- Location within New York Location within the United States
- Location: East Ave., bet. Erie St. and Prospect St., Owego, New York
- Coordinates: 42°6′26″N 76°15′55″W
- Area: 51.2 acres (20.7 ha)
- Architect: Dexter, Stephen
- NRHP reference No.: 02000305
- Added to NRHP: April 01, 2002

Evergreen Cemetery is a historic rural cemetery located at Owego in Tioga County, New York. It was established by the village of Owego in March 1851. It is placed on a hill overlooking the village and Susquehanna River valley. In 1920, a small, Gothic style memorial chapel was constructed.

It was listed on the National Register of Historic Places in 2002.

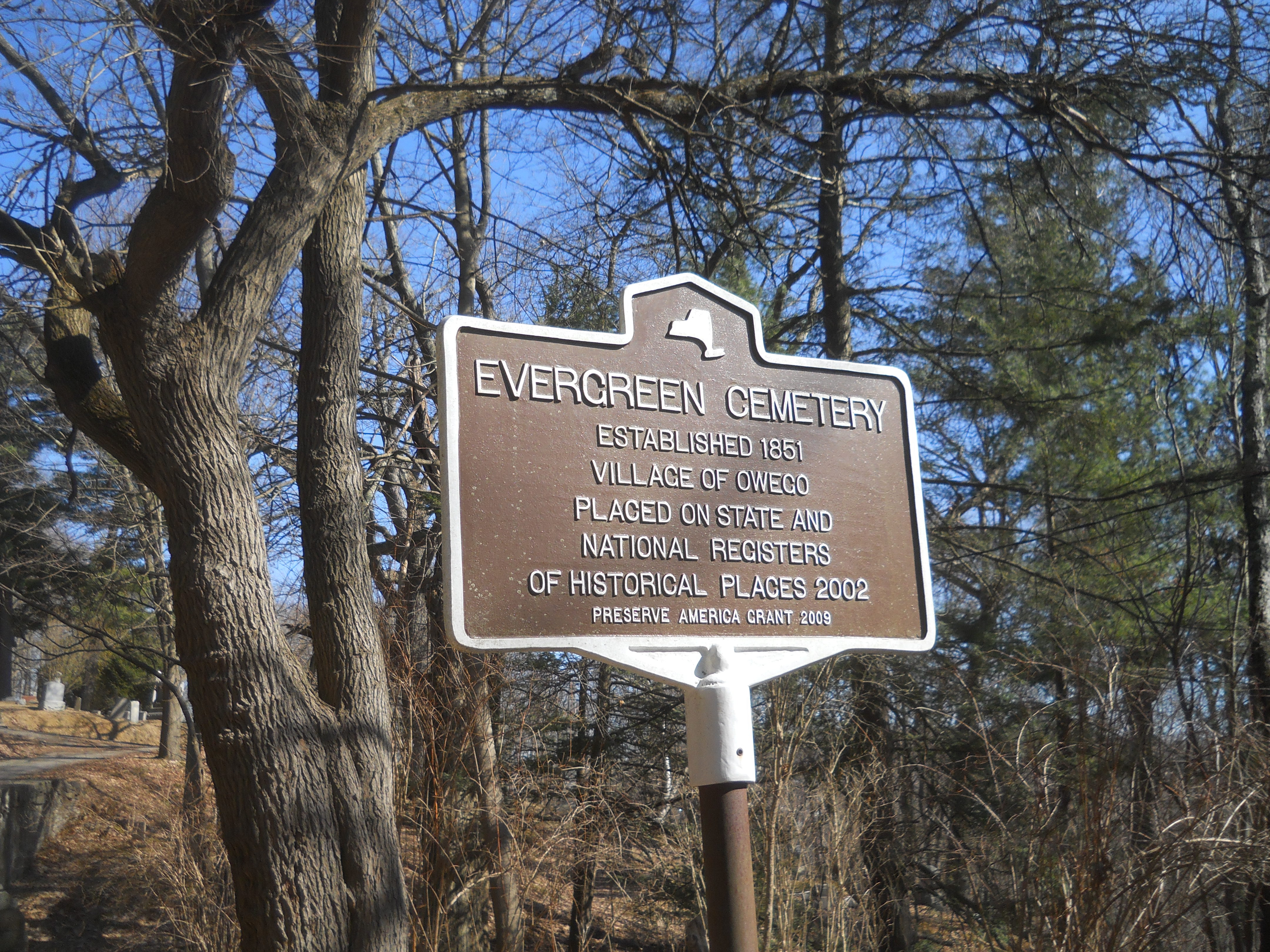
Evergreen Cemetery historic plaque

== Notable burials ==
- John R. Drake (1782–1857) US Congressman
- John Mason Parker (1805–1873) US Congressman
- Thomas C. Platt (1833–1910) US Congressman and US Senator
- George Adams Post (1854–1925) US Congressman
- Howard W. Robison (1915–1987) US Congressman.
- Richard Stout (1834–1896) Civil War Medal of Honor Recipient
- John J. Taylor (1808–1892) US Congressman
