= Elbridge G. Spaulding =

American politician (1809–1897)

Hon. Elbridge G. Spaulding
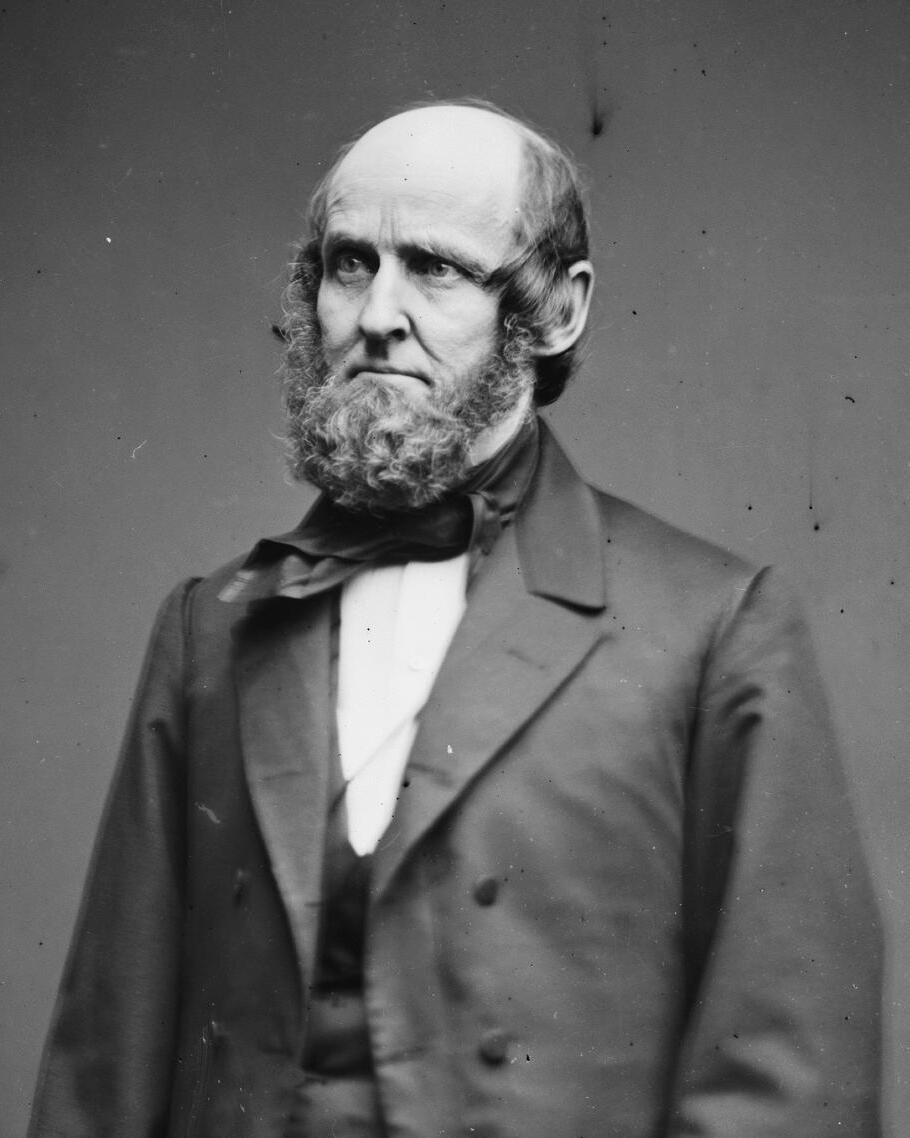

Member of the U.S. House of Representatives from New York's 32nd district
- In office March 4, 1849 – March 3, 1851
- Preceded by: Nathan K. Hall
- Succeeded by: Solomon G. Haven
- In office March 4, 1859 – March 3, 1863
- Preceded by: Israel T. Hatch
- Succeeded by: Walter L. Sessions

New York State Treasurer
- In office 1854–1855
- Preceded by: Benjamin Welch
- Succeeded by: Stephen Clark

Member of the New York State Assembly from the Erie County, 1st district
- In office January 1, 1848 – December 31, 1848
- Preceded by: District created
- Succeeded by: Benoni Thompson

17th Mayor of the City of Buffalo
- In office 1847–1848
- Preceded by: Solomon G. Haven
- Succeeded by: Orlando Allen

Personal details
- Born: Elbridge Gerry Spaulding; February 24, 1809 Summer Hill, New York, U.S.
- Died: May 5, 1897 (aged 88) Buffalo, New York, U.S.
- Party: Whig, Republican
- Spouses: Antoinette Rich (m. 1837; died 1841) Nancy Selden Strong (m. 1842; died 1852) Delia Strong (m. 1854; died 1895)
- Children: 3
- Parent(s): Edward Spaulding; Mehitable Goodridge
- Profession: Politician, lawyer

Elbridge Gerry Spaulding (February 24, 1809 – May 5, 1897) was an American lawyer, banker, and Republican Party politician. He opposed slavery and supported the idea for the first U.S. currency not backed by gold or silver, thus helping to keep the Union's economy afloat during the U.S. Civil War.

== Early life and education ==
Spaulding was born on February 24, 1809, in Summer Hill, New York, the first of nine children of Edward Spaulding (1764–1845) and Mehitable Goodridge (1770–1838).

In 1829, he began the study of law in the office of Fitch & Dibble at Batavia, New York. During this time he served as recording clerk in the county clerk's office to meet his expenses. In 1832, he completed his studies in Attica, New York, with Harvey Putnam. Later that year he was admitted to the bar in Genesee County, New York. In 1834, he moved to Buffalo, and became a clerk in the office of Potter & Babcock, leading attorneys in the city.

== Career ==
In March 1836, he was appointed City Clerk of Buffalo. In 1841, Spaulding was elected Alderman of the Third Ward, and served as Chairman of the Executive Committee. He became the Mayor of Buffalo in 1847 and was a member of the New York State Assembly (Erie Co., 1st d.) in 1848. While in the Assembly, he secured passage of a law authorizing the formation of gas light corporations in the State. The Buffalo Gas Light Company was the first such created, and he became a director and stockholder of it.

=== United States Congress ===
Spaulding was elected as a Whig to the 31st United States Congress, serving from 1849 to 1851 as the representative for New York's 32nd congressional district, a district created on March 4, 1833, for the eventual 13th President of the United States Millard Fillmore. Spaulding served for one term in the U.S. House of Representatives. In 1854, he became the New York State Treasurer, serving until 1855. He was elected again to the House of Representatives as a Republican, serving in the 36th and 37th United States Congresses from 1859 to 1863. In 1860, Spaulding delivered a speech denouncing the Democratic Party and its pro-slavery views, and urging Republicans to support Abraham Lincoln for the U.S. presidency.

==== Legal Tender Act ====
It was said that Spaulding was the one who figured out that the American government needed to print money to pay for the Civil War. At the time, it was regarded as economic heresy, but today many believe that the country would not have survived without it. Such an idea was then dismissed by some as "fiat money", money that is money not because it is backed by gold or silver, but because some government says it is money. He was Chairman of a House Ways and Means Subcommittee when the government was in danger of running out of money to pay for the war. He wrote a law that allowed the government to print money and declare it had to be accepted as legal tender.

In a biography of Cornelius Vanderbilt, titled The First Tycoon, T. J. Stiles wrote that Spaulding "performed a true miracle: he conjured money out of nothing, and so contributed more toward the Union victory (and the future of New York’s financial sector) than any single battlefield victory." Stiles continued, "If Wall Street had saints, then the college of financial cardinals would surely canonize Elbridge G. Spaulding."

In 1862, he drafted the Legal Tender Act, and the National Currency Bank Bill. At the time, the only circulating paper money was notes issued by banks. Those notes were supposed to be convertible into gold, although the banks had been forced to suspend such conversions at the end of 1861. There was no central bank. The bill passed Congress not because it was thought to be good policy absent a crisis, but because it was necessary. "It was at once a loan to the government without interest and a national currency, which was so much needed for disbursement in small sums during the pressing exigencies of the war," Spaulding wrote years later in his book, History of the Legal Tender Paper Money.

== Personal life ==
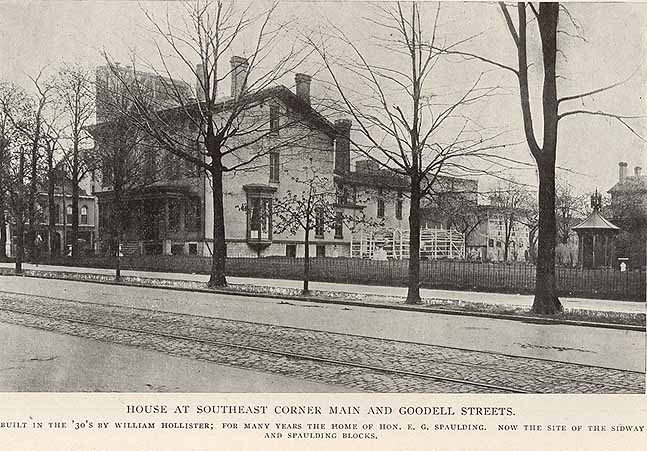
The Spaulding home in Buffalo, built in the 1830s by William Hollister

On September 5, 1837, he married Antoinette Rich (1818–1841), daughter of Gaius Basset Rich and Aphia Salisbury Rich. Antoinette died in 1841 without bearing any children.

On September 5, 1842, he married Nancy Selden Strong (1824–1852), the daughter of Samuel Strong and Delia Selden Strong of Windsor, Connecticut. Together with Nancy, he had three children before her death in 1852. They were:

- Charlotte Spaulding (1843–1934), who married Franklin Sidway (1834–1920)
- Edward Rich Spaulding (1845–1908), who married Mary Tenney Blanchard (1851–1923)
- Samuel Strong Spaulding (1849–1933), who married Annie Margaret Watson (1852–1924)

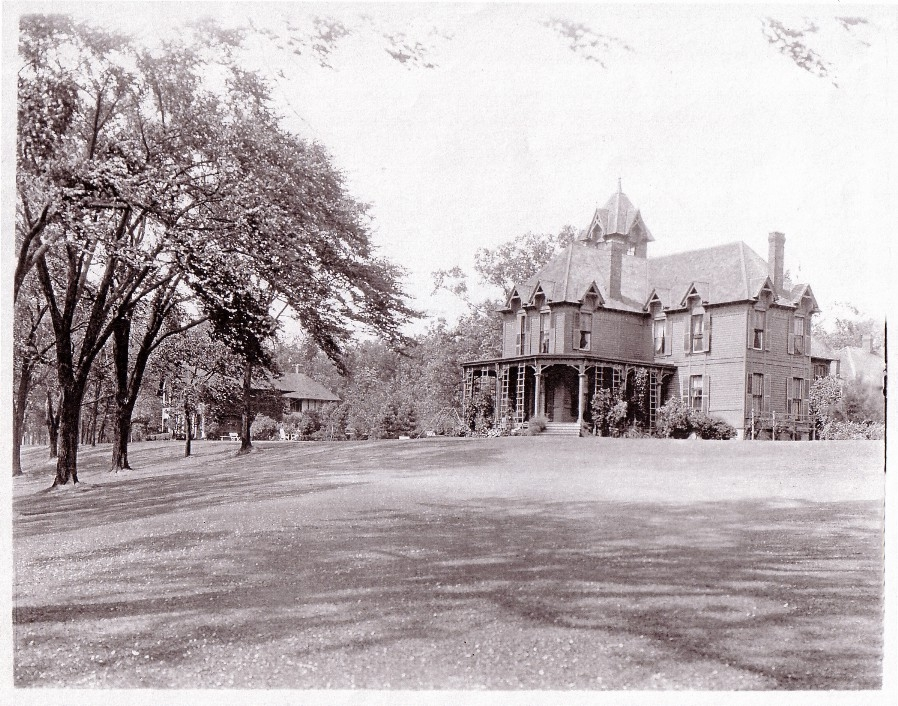
"River Lawn" estate on Grand Island, New York

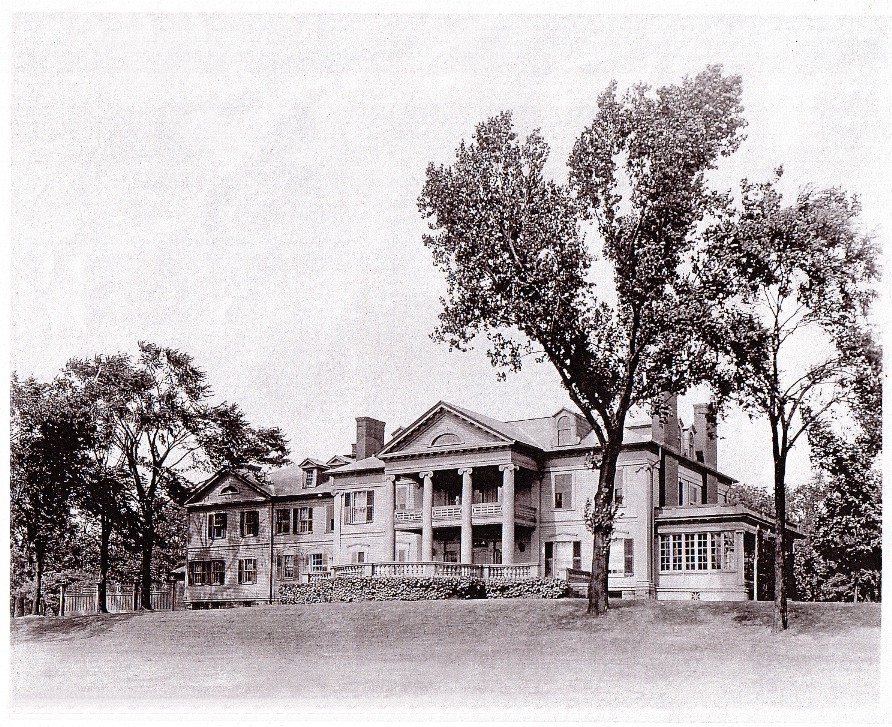
The Spaulding-Sidway home built on "River Lawn" in Grand Island

On May 2, 1854, after Nancy's death in 1852, he married Delia Strong (1812–1895), Nancy's sister. Spaulding's marriage with Delia lasted over 40 years until her death in 1895, however, they did not have any children together.

Spaulding died on May 5, 1897, in Buffalo and is buried at Forest Lawn Cemetery. In his will, Spaulding indicated that at his death, the house at 775 Main Street was to be demolished. Therefore, in 1897 the house was torn down. Later the "Spaulding Building", built in 1906 at 763 Main St. by Edward Rich Spaulding, and the "Sidway Building", built in 1907 at 775–783 Main St. by Franklin Sidway and Charlotte Spaulding Sidway, were both built on the property.

=== Residences ===
Around 1850, Spaulding bought the "Hollister Mansion" at 775 Main Street in Buffalo, the house in which Delia and Spaulding lived for their entire married lives. The property had earlier been part of the farm of Deacon Jabez Goodell, who in 1830 sold it to William Hollister and George Palmer jointly, each of whom planned to build their residences on the property. Hollister chose the western part, on Main Street, and Palmer the quieter and more rural eastern part, on Washington Street. Hollister built his house in 1835–1836 (on the southeast corner of Main and Goodell) and lived there until it was sold to Spaulding in 1850, who made extensive alterations. Spaulding's daughter, Charlotte, married Franklin Sidway in the house in 1866.

Around 1870, Spaulding built a Victorian era Stick Style home as his summer retreat on Grand Island named "River Lawn". He owned a half mile of river front that encompassed 350 acres of broad woodlands and cultivated fields. There, Spaulding indulged his hobby of raising some of the finest cattle in the nation. Lewis F. Allen, uncle-in-law of Grover Cleveland, was the first of the so-called society of the day to build a house on the island, and Spaulding was the second. After that, it became a fashionable mecca, and numerous other houses were built. In 1879, the socially prominent Falconwood Club, formed in 1858, built its clubhouse adjacent to the Spaulding property.

The boathouse he constructed on his "River Lawn" estate, known as the Spaulding-Sidway Boathouse, was listed on the National Register of Historic Places in 1998. Much later in 1935, the boathouse was floated up river to its present location in Oakfield by Frank St. John Sidway, Spaulding's grandson.

== Legacy ==
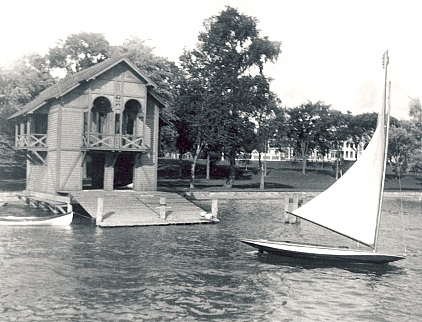
Spaulding-Sidway Boathouse in 1903

In 1846, Spaulding was one of the original founders that helped to get the University at Buffalo established. He was a member of the original council of the university, and remained a member until his death in 1897. Today, there is an undergraduate dormitory, as well as academic and administrative offices, named for him at the university.

During the 1930s, Spaulding's "River Lawn" estate later was donated to the New York State Office of Parks, Recreation and Historic Preservation, by his heirs, and became the basis for present day Beaver Island State Park.

== Published works ==
- 1869 – History of the Legal Tender Paper Money Issued During the Great Rebellion
- 1875 – Legal Tender Act
- 1876 – Centennial: One Hundred Years of Progress in the Business of Banking

== See also ==
- Frank St. John Sidway

New York State Assembly
New district	Member of the New York State Assembly for Erie County, 1st district 1848	Succeeded by Benoni Thompson
Political offices
Preceded by Solomon G. Haven	Mayor of Buffalo, New York; 1847	Succeeded by Orlando Allen
Preceded by Benjamin Welch	New York State Treasurer; 1854–1855	Succeeded by Stephen Clark
U.S. House of Representatives
Preceded by Nathan K. Hall	Member of the U.S. House of Representatives from New York's 32nd congressional district March 4, 1849 – March 3, 1851	Succeeded by Solomon G. Haven
Preceded by Israel T. Hatch	Member of the U.S. House of Representatives from New York's 32nd congressional district March 4, 1859 – March 3, 1863	Succeeded by District abolished
