= Spaulding-Sidway Boathouse =

- U.S. National Register of Historic Places
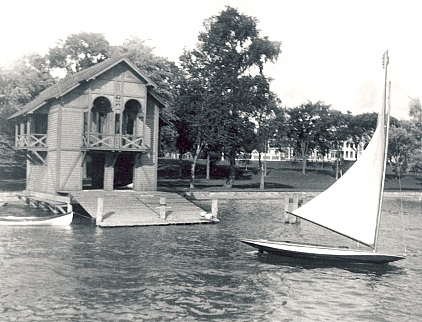
- Spaulding-Sidway Boathouse, 1903

- Location within New York Location within the United States
- Location: 2296 W. Oakfield Rd., Grand Island, New York
- Coordinates: 42°58′16″N 78°58′38″W
- Built: 1870
- Architectural style: Stick/Eastlake
- NRHP reference No.: 98000552
- Added to NRHP: May 20, 1998

Spaulding-Sidway Boathouse is a historic boathouse located on Grand Island in Erie County, New York. The boathouse was built as part of the "River Lawn" estate of Elbridge G. Spaulding (1809–1897).

== History ==
The Spaulding-Sidway Boathouse is a Late Victorian Stick / Queen Anne style frame structure constructed in 1870. The boathouse is a two-story frame structure, clad in clapboard, on concrete piers.

Between 1935 and 1940, to save the boathouse from demolition when the Spaulding estate was acquired in order to become Beaver Island State Park, neighboring property owner Frank St. John Sidway, a grandson of Spaulding, moved it about 270 feet northwest to his land. In about 1990, steel framing was added to shore up the original wood framework.

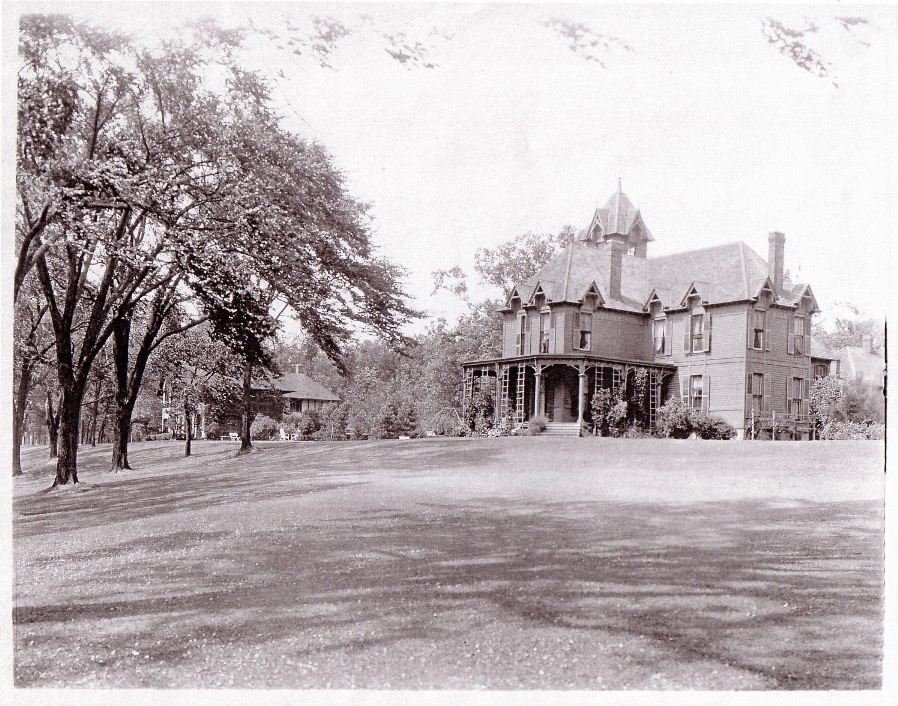
Elbridge G. Spaulding's "River Lawn" estate on Grand Island, New York

== Significance ==
The building is a rare surviving example of a small boathouse used primarily for storage and social activities and is reflective of Grand Island's importance as a seasonal recreational area in the 1800s. The boathouse has been continuously used for light boat storage and social activities since it was built, and although many boathouses on Grand Island have fallen victim to weather, it stands today virtually as built and is now a part of a private residence. It was listed on the National Register of Historic Places in 1998.

== See also ==
- Elbridge G. Spaulding
- Frank St. John Sidway
