= St. Bridget's Roman Catholic Church Complex (Bloomfield, New York) =

Historic church in New York, United States

- U.S. National Register of Historic Places
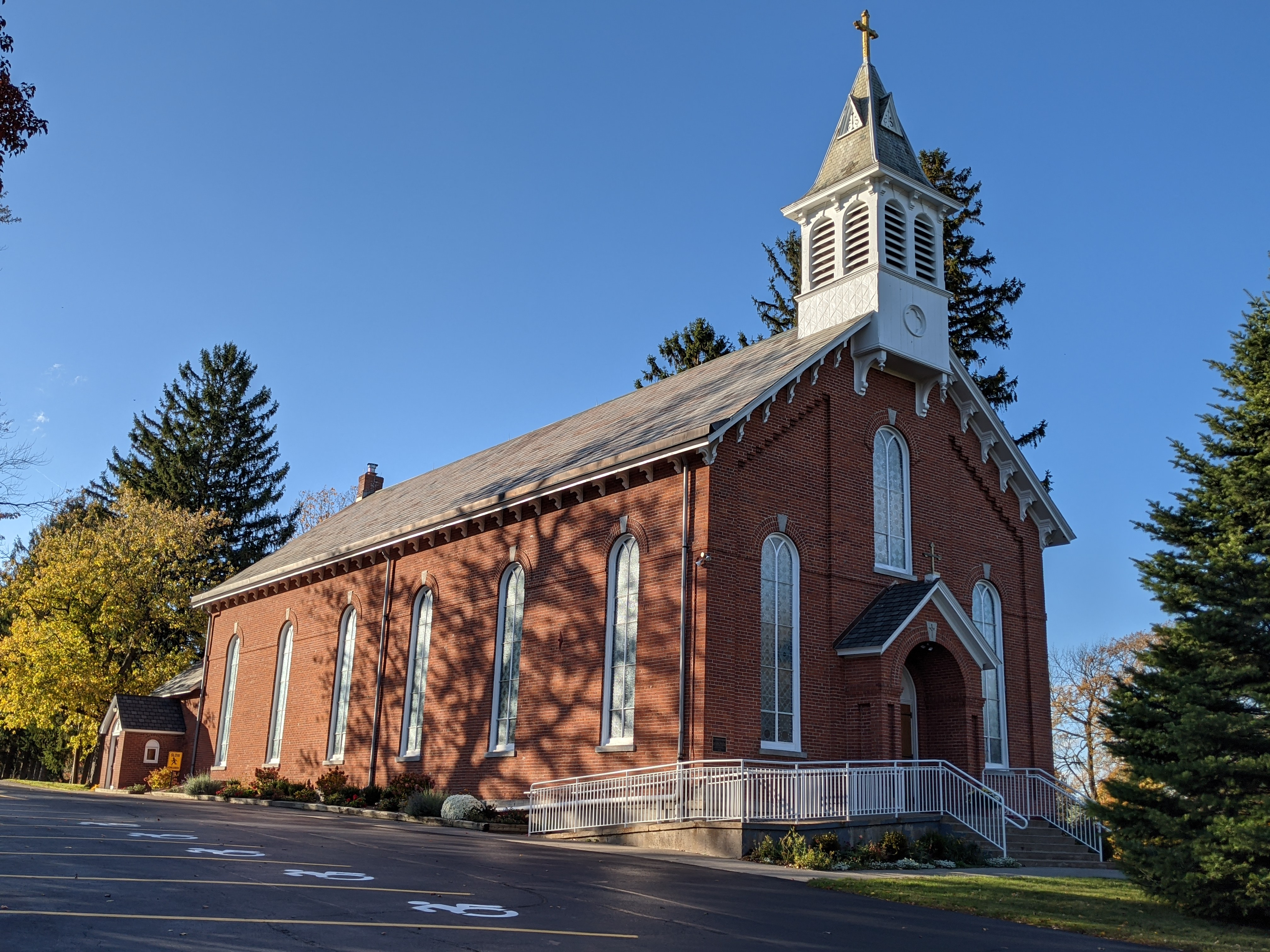

- Location within New York Location within the United States
- Location: 15 Church St., between Church and Michigan Sts., Bloomfield, New York
- Coordinates: 42°54′2″N 77°25′57″W
- Area: 8 acres (3.2 ha)
- Built: 1874
- Architect: Neenan Bros.
- Architectural style: Colonial Revival, Italianate
- NRHP reference No.: 92001052
- Added to NRHP: August 28, 1992

St. Bridget's Roman Catholic Church Complex is a historic Roman Catholic church complex located in Bloomfield, Ontario County, New York. The complex consists of three contributing buildings (church, built 1874–1875; rectory, built 1897; and carriage barn, built 1904) and one contributing site, the church cemetery. the church is a late Victorian eclectic brick edifice with restrained Italianate and Romanesque Revival–style design and decorative features. It features a square, wood bell tower. The rectory is a 2 1/2-story Colonial Revival–style frame building and features a verandah with Doric order columns. A 1 1/2-story carriage barn stands behind the rectory. The six-acre cemetery includes burials dating from 1866 to 1942.

It was listed on the National Register of Historic Places in 1992.
