= Franklin Sidway =

American businessman and banker (1834-1920)

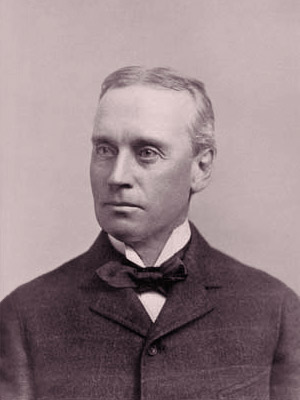
- Born: July 23, 1834; Buffalo, New York
- Died: March 20, 1920 (aged 85); Buffalo, New York
- Resting place: Forest Lawn Cemetery
- Education: Canandaigua Academy
- Known for: Commissioned Interior with Portraits
- Spouse: Charlotte Spaulding
- Children: 5 (including Frank St. John Sidway)
- Parent(s): Jonathan Sidway; Parnell St. John
- Relatives: Elbridge G. Spaulding (father-in-law)

Franklin Sidway (July 7, 1834 – March 20, 1920) was an American businessman and banker from Buffalo, New York, known for building the Sidway Building in Buffalo, the Spaulding-Sidway house in Grand Island, and commissioning the 1865 painting, Interior with Portraits, by American artist Thomas Le Clear.

== Early life ==
Franklin Sidway was born on July 23, 1834, in Buffalo, New York, to Jonathan Sidway (1784–1847) and Parnell (St. John) Sidway (1801–1879). Of the nine children of Jonathan and Parnell, only four reached adulthood.

Franklin's grandfather, James Sidway, was the first of his family to immigrate to the United States. James was born in Dudley Woodside, England in 1759 and was educated there. During the revolutionary period he immigrated to the American colonies where he made settlement in Orange County, New York, and enlisted as a drummer in a New York regiment and served until the regiment was mustered out of service.

Sidway attended private schools including Canandaigua Academy and the George W. Francis School in Yonkers, New York, among others. In 1853, after completing his schooling, he toured Europe.

== Career ==
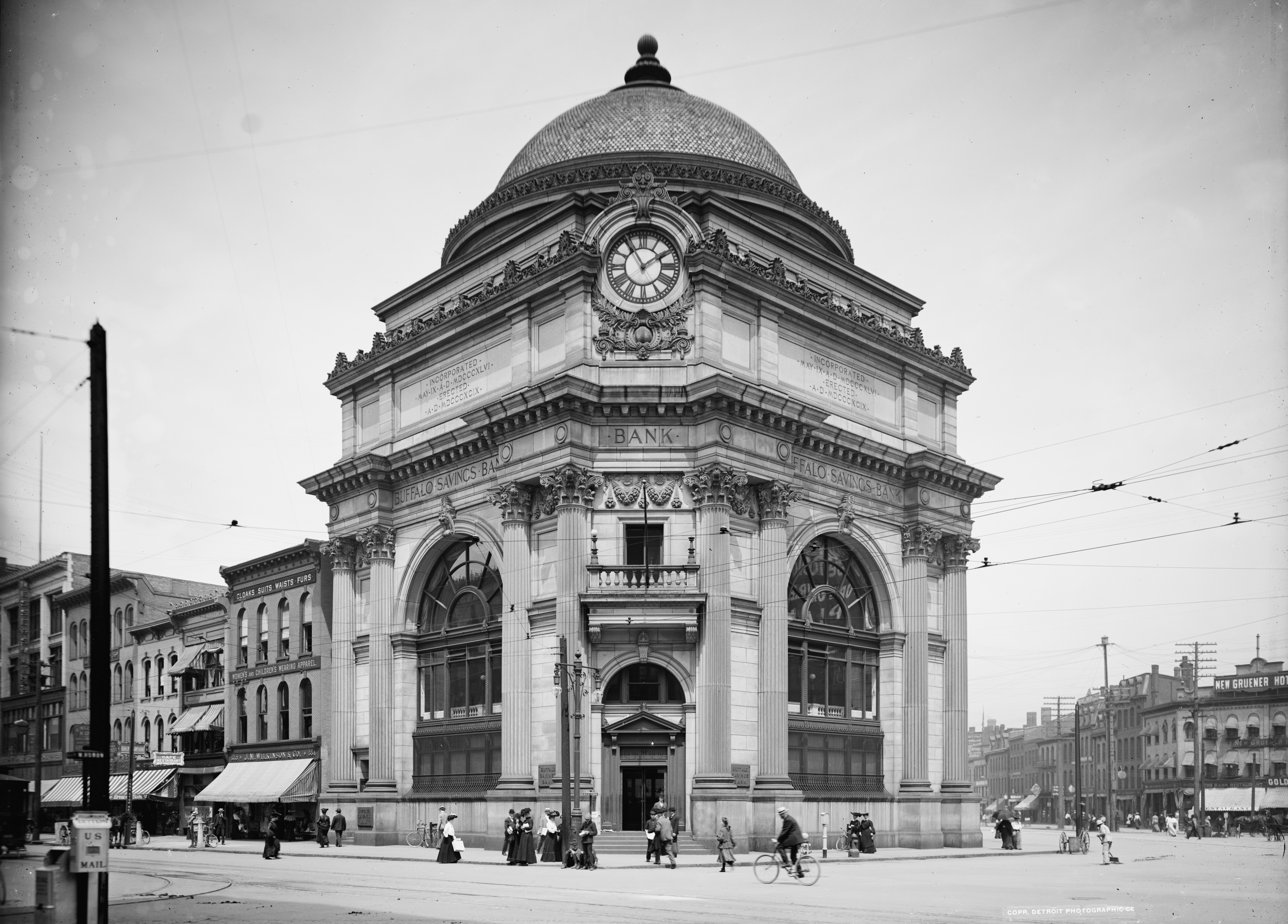
Buffalo Savings Bank in 1904

Sidway was one of the organizers and founders of Sidway, Skinner & Moore, general ship chandlers and grocers. Sidway, Skinner & Moore was very successful up until 1861, when it was dissolved due to the American Civil War.

Shortly after his marriage in 1866, Sidway joined Farmers and Mechanics Bank as assistant cashier in January 1867, and in January 1872 became cashier. Later he was promoted to vice president of the bank, a role in which he served until the bank's dissolution in 1898. Sidway also served as a trustee of the Buffalo Savings Bank. He executed the estate of William E. Story Sr., which led to the 1891 court case Hamer v. Sidway, an important contract law case which clarified rules on legal consideration and unilateral contracts.

=== Civil War ===
During the American Civil War, Sidway was commissioned as colonel of volunteers with the authority to raise a regiment. He recruited several companies, however, when payment of bounties was discontinued, the organization was not completed and the enlisted men were transferred to another regiment.

== Personal life ==
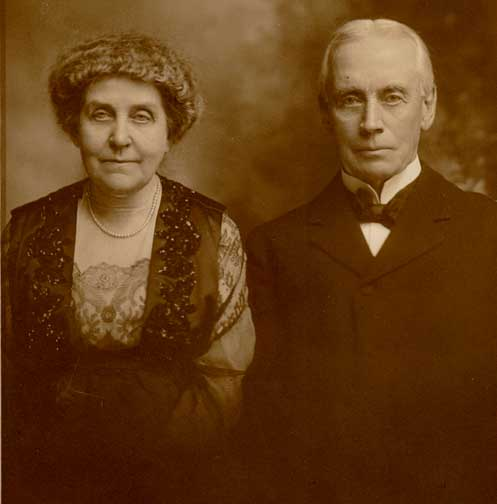
Franklin and Charlotte Sidway

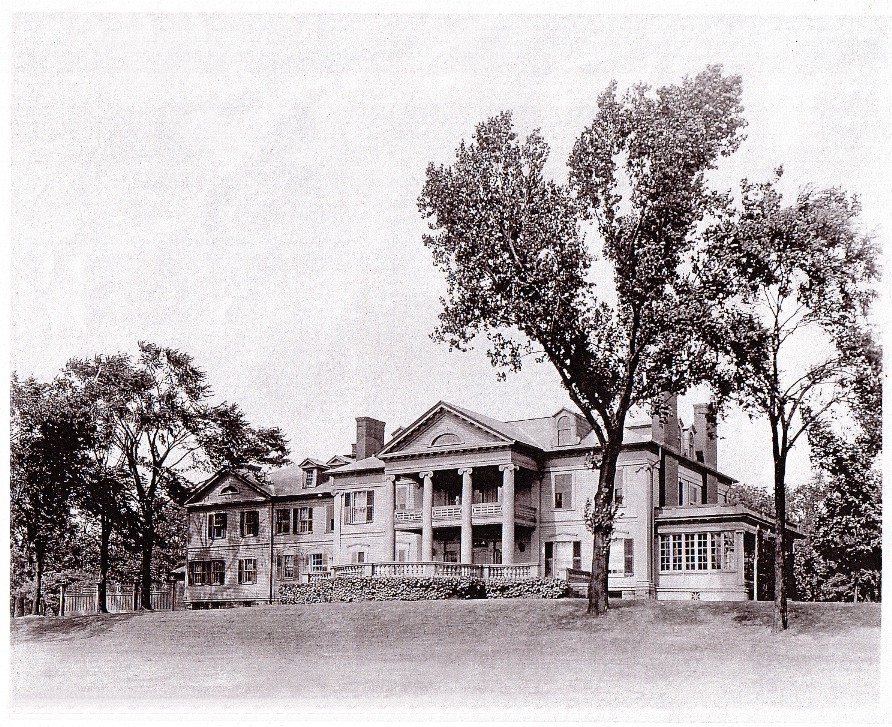
The Spaulding-Sidway home built on "River Lawn" in Grand Island

On February 27, 1866, Sidway married Charlotte Spaulding (1843–1934), the only daughter of U.S. Representative Elbridge G. Spaulding (1809–1897). Together they had five children:

- Harold Spaulding Sidway (1868–), who married Mary Chase
- Frank St. John Sidway (1869–1938), who married Amelia Minirva (Roberts) Sidway (1881–1972)
- Edith Sidway (1872–1958), who married William Allen Gardner (1869–1941)
- Clarence Spaulding Sidway (1877–1953), who married Genevieve Clark (Hingston) Sidway (1880–1939)
- Ralph Huntington Sidway (1884–1936), who married Stephana Ostrom (Barnum) Sidway (1882–1962)

Sidway was a life member of the Buffalo Library, member of the Buffalo Historical Society, and former treasurer and a member of the Buffalo General Hospital Board. He was also a trustee of the Forest Lawn Cemetery. Sidway had a keen interest in athletics and outdoor sports. He was a member of the old Forester Gun Club and was a member of one of the first four oared rowing crews organized in Buffalo. Sidway was president of the Archery Club of Buffalo, the Toxophilites, and was one of the organizers of the Niagara Base Ball Club, one of the first amateur base-ball clubs organized. He was a member, and one time president, of the Buffalo Club and the Country Club of Buffalo. In addition, he was president of the Falconwood Club for many years, which was founded by Lewis F. Allen in 1858. Franklin and Charlotte enjoyed traveling, sailing on the St. Louis in 1899 between Southampton, England, and New York City, and spending time at the Government House in 1895 in the Bahamas.

Franklin Sidway died March 7, 1920, was interred at Forest Lawn Cemetery, Buffalo.

=== Real estate ===
Upon the death of Elbridge Spaulding in May 1897, his 350-acre estate on Grand Island known as "River Lawn" passed to Spaulding's daughter and Sidway's wife, Charlotte Spaulding Sidway. On the estate, Franklin and Charlotte built a Georgian mansion known as the Spaulding-Sidway home. The house was torn down when "River Lawn" became part of Beaver Island State Park in 1935. In Spaulding's will, he also indicated that at his death, his house at 775 Main Street in Buffalo was to be demolished. Therefore, in 1897 the house was torn down and in 1906, the "Spaulding Building" was built at 763 Main Street by Edward Rich Spaulding (Spaulding's son and Charlotte's brother) and in 1907, the "Sidway Building" was built at 775 -783 Main St. by Franklin and Charlotte on the property.

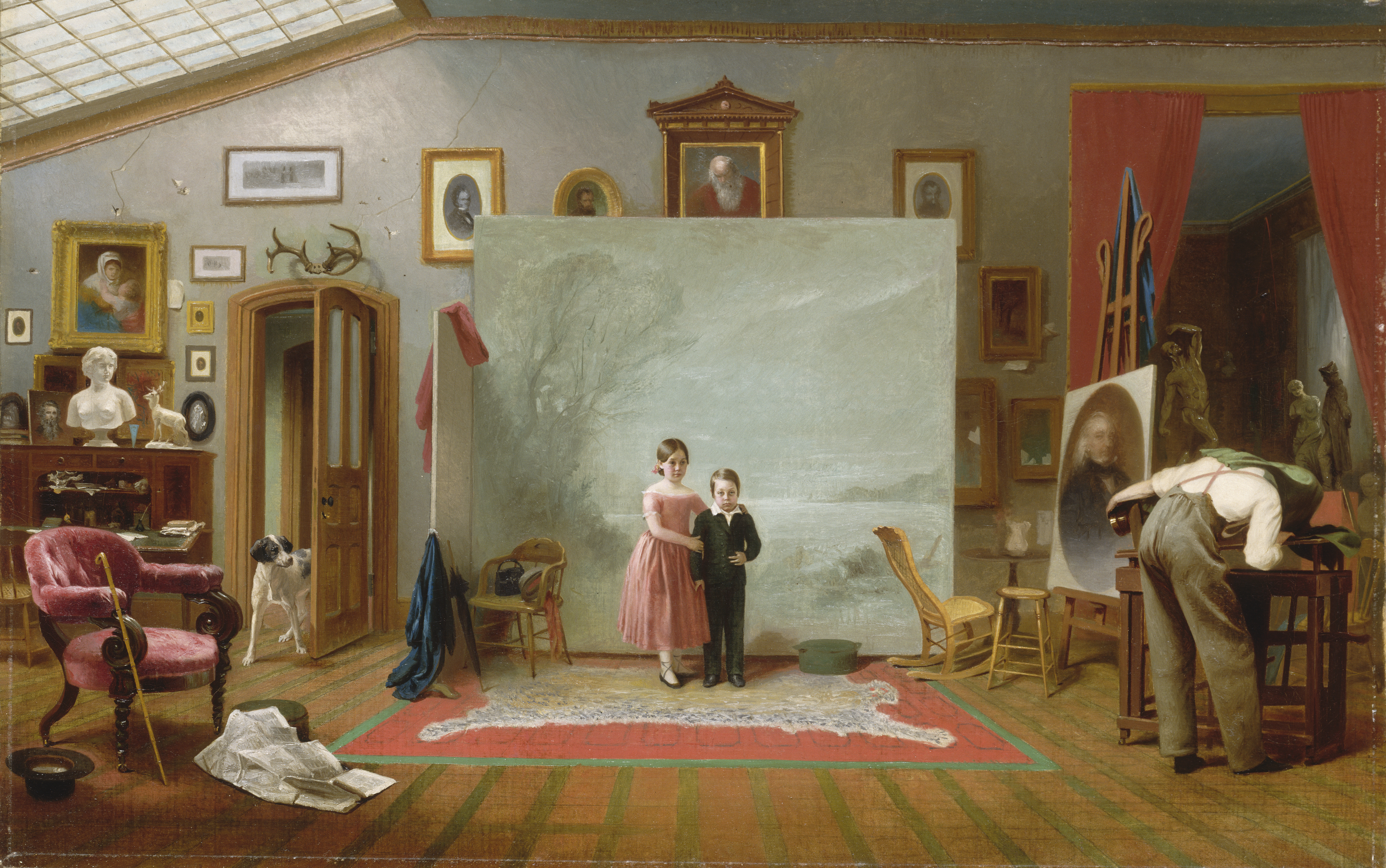
Thomas Le Clear's 1865 painting Interior with Portraits

=== Interior with Portraits ===
In 1865, Sidway commissioned American artist Thomas Le Clear to paint Interior with Portraits. The painting is a genre scene that features two children, James and Parnell Sidway, posing for a photograph in an artist's studio. Parnell was an adolescent when she died of illness in 1850, while James was a 26-year-old volunteer firefighter who died in a hotel fire shortly before the painting was commissioned. The likenesses of the subjects as children were painted from family daguerreotypes, as some painters of the time regarded photography with suspicion and refused to use photographs as references for portraits. A dog is depicted just entering the studio, another acknowledgement of early photography's limitation to still subjects. The painting is on display at the Smithsonian American Art Museum in Washington, D.C.

== See also ==
- Elbridge G. Spaulding
- Frank St. John Sidway
- Interior with Portraits
