= United States Post Office (Owego, New York) =

- US Post Office-Owego
- U.S. National Register of Historic Places
- U.S. Historic district – Contributing property
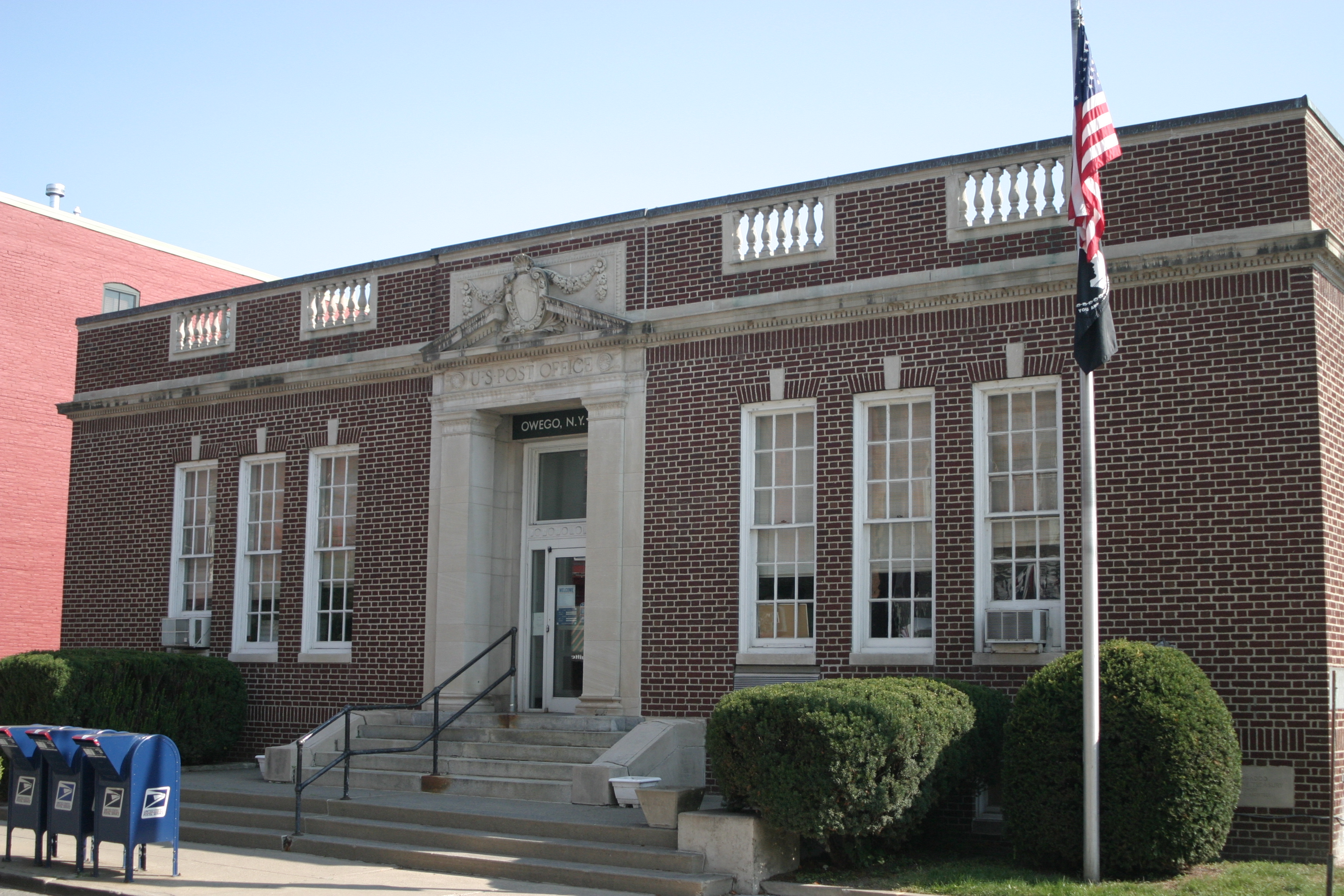

- Location within New York Location within the United States
- Location: 6 Lake St., Owego, New York
- Coordinates: 42°6′10″N 76°15′41″W
- Area: less than one acre
- Built: 1919
- Architect: Wetmore, James A.; US Treasury Department
- Architectural style: Colonial Revival
- MPS: US Post Offices in New York State, 1858-1943, TR
- NRHP reference No.: 88002391
- Added to NRHP: May 11, 1989

US Post Office-Owego is a historic post office building located at Owego in Tioga County, New York. It was designed in 1917 and built in 1919-1920 and is one of a number of post offices in New York State designed by the Office of the Supervising Architect under James A. Wetmore. It is a symmetrical one story, red brick clad building on a raised foundation executed in the Colonial Revival style. It is a contributing structure in the Owego Central Historic District.

It was listed on the National Register of Historic Places in 1988.
