= Ketchum grenade =

Type of grenade

- Cross-section
- Type: Hand grenade
- Place of origin: United States

Service history
- In service: 1861−1865
- Used by: United States, Confederate States of America
- Wars: American Civil War

Production history
- Designer: William Ketchum
- Designed: 1861
- No. built: 93,200

Specifications
- Mass: 1–5 lb (0.5–2.3 kg)
- Filling: Gunpowder
- Detonation mechanism: Percussion cap

The Ketchum grenade was a type of hand grenade used in the American Civil War. It was patented on August 20, 1861, (U.S. Pat. #33,089) by William Ketchum, a former mayor of Buffalo, New York, and was partially adopted in the Union Army. They were used in battles such as Vicksburg and Petersburg (both major sieges in the war).

== Background ==
Prior to the American Civil War, hand grenades were simple three-pounder or six-pounder cannonballs filled with gunpowder and fitted with a fuse kept in place with a piece of rag or clay and thrown or simply dropped over the enemy ramparts. These designs often failed to detonate either because the fuse fell off or was extinguished during flight or on landing, largely falling out of use. During the Civil War, hand grenades reappeared into the battlefield: the invention of the percussion cap allowed the development of more advanced designs, such as the Ketchum and the Haynes "Excelsior" grenades.

== Description ==
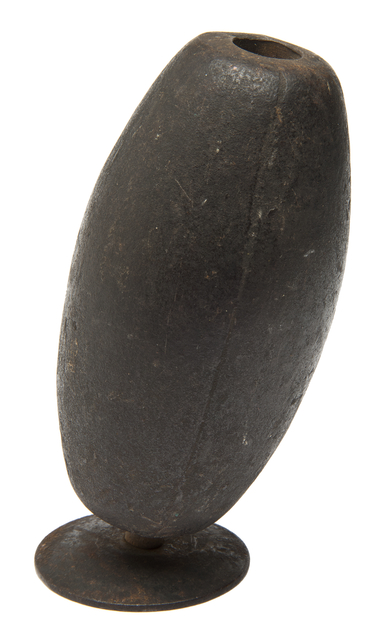
Ketchum grenade from the collection of the Minnesota Historical Society

The grenade consisted of a cast iron oval head containing a charge of gunpowder, an eight-inch (20 cm) wooden tail rod with four pasteboard fins, while the front end of the grenade had a hole bored and fitted with percussion cap nipple which detonated the gunpowder charge upon impact. Into this hole, a short metal rod with a flat dished end was fitted in, forming the nose of the grenade. Before throwing it, the soldier first removed the nose rod, inserted a cap over the nipple with a hollow stick, re-inserted the nose rod, which was kept separated from the cap by a spring, and finally poured the powder at the opposite end.

Upon impact, the nose rod was driven towards the percussion cap, detonating the gunpowder charge, shattering the iron head into lethal fragments.

The Ketchum grenade was made in several sizes ranging from one, three and five pounds (0.45, 1.36 and 2.27 kg), though the smaller grenades were more popular by troops since they could be thrown farther and with better accuracy. About 93,200 grenades were procured by the Union Army throughout the war.

== Combat history ==
After the Union Army found out that frontal charges against a dug in enemy were suicidal, they began issuing hand grenades to its soldiers to dislodge Confederate forces from their trenches.

One of the most famous accounts of Ketchum grenades use occurred during the Siege of Port Hudson. The New York troops threw Ketchum grenades over the entrenchments into the earthworks of the Confederates. The defenders figured out that if the plunger didn't strike at the correct angle the grenade would fall harmlessly onto the ground. Lieutenant Howard C. Wright described the scene from the Confederate side of the assault:

The enemy had come this time prepared with hand grenades to throw into our works from the outside. When these novel missiles commenced falling among the Arkansas troops they did not know what to make of them, and the first few which they caught not having burst, they threw them back upon the enemy in the ditch. This time many of them exploded and their character was at once revealed to our men. Always equal to any emergency, they quickly devised a scheme [...] Spreading blankets behind the parapet, the grenades fell harmlessly into them, whereupon our boys would pick them up and hurling them with much greater force down the moat they would almost invariably explode.

A similar incident occurred during the Siege of Vicksburg according to an 1899 account by Private J. M. Sharp:

These grenades were thrown in great numbers, and with deadly effect, when a happy thought occurred to Private Masterson, who gathered a blanket and stretching it open above the ground began to catch the shells, while others would hurl them back at the foe, and soon we routed them with their own infernal machines.

While the Ketchum (and other contemporary designs) was an innovative design at the time incorporating a mechanical fuse, it was also complex, costly to produce and dangerous to its users. The blast radius of the heavy versions of the grenade exceeded the distance they could be thrown.
