= Bloomfield, New York =

- Village
- Location within the state of New York
- Coordinates: 42°53′57″N 77°25′47″W
- Country: United States
- State: New York
- County: Ontario

Area
  - Total: 1.39 sq mi (3.61 km^{2})
  - Land: 1.39 sq mi (3.61 km^{2})
  - Water: 0 sq mi (0.00 km^{2})
- Elevation: 876 ft (267 m)

Population (2020)
  - Total: 1,277
  - Density: 915.3/sq mi (353.41/km^{2})
- Time zone: UTC-5 (Eastern (EST))
  - Summer (DST): UTC-4 (EDT)
- ZIP code: 14469
- Area code: 585
- FIPS code: 36-06945
- GNIS feature ID: 0979686
- Website: www.bloomfieldny.org

Bloomfield is a village in Ontario County, New York, United States. As of the 2020 census, Bloomfield had a population of 1,277.

The Village of Bloomfield is in the Town of East Bloomfield and is west of Canandaigua.

== History ==
The village was part of the Phelps and Gorham Purchase (1788). It was incorporated in 1990 to combine the two adjacent communities of Holcomb and East Bloomfield.

The St. Bridget's Roman Catholic Church Complex and St. Peter's Episcopal Church are listed on the National Register of Historic Places.

== Geography ==
Bloomfield is located at 42°53′57″N 77°25′47″W (42.899218, -77.429623).

According to the United States Census Bureau, the village has a total area of 1.4 square miles (3.6 km^{2}), all land.

The village is mostly situated between New York State Route 444 and conjoined US 20/New York State Route 5. New York State Route 64 also joins US-20 west of the village.

Fish Creek flows past the north side of the village, a tributary of Ganargua Creek and connects to the north with Erie Canal.

== Demographics ==
Historical population
Census	Pop.	Note	%±
2000	1,267		—
2010	1,361		7.4%
2020	1,277		−6.2%
U.S. Decennial Census

As of the census of 2000, there were 1,267 people, 474 households, and 346 families residing in the village. The population density was 900.2 inhabitants per square mile (347.6/km^{2}). There were 497 housing units at an average density of 353.1 per square mile (136.3/km^{2}). The racial makeup of the village was 97.95% White, 0.95% African American, 0.16% Native American, 0.08% Pacific Islander, 0.32% from other races, and 0.55% from two or more races. Hispanic or Latino of any race were 1.03% of the population.

There were 474 households, out of which 50.0% had children under the age of 18 living with them, 57.6% were married couples living together, 11.6% had a female householder with no husband present, and 27.0% were non-families. 19.8% of all households were made up of individuals, and 6.5% had someone living alone who was 65 years of age or older. The average household size was 2.62 and the average family size was 3.00.

In the village, the population was spread out, with 26.4% under the age of 18, 7.8% from 18 to 24, 31.9% from 25 to 44, 23.0% from 45 to 64, and 10.8% who were 65 years of age or older. The median age was 36 years. For every 100 females, there were 93.1 males. For every 100 females age 18 and over, there were 91.8 males.

The median income for a household in the village was $47,663, and the median income for a family was $53,977. Males had a median income of $35,197 versus $24,485 for females. The per capita income for the village was $23,669. About 3.0% of families and 4.1% of the population were below the poverty line, including 3.6% of those under age 18 and 1.4% of those age 65 or over.

== Notable people ==
- Eunice Newton Foote, civil rights activist and the first scientist known to have experimented on the warming effect of sunlight on different gases
- Jonathan Child, first mayor of Rochester, New York
- Paulina Kellogg Wright Davis, abolitionist, suffragist, and educator
- Ryan Lochte, American professional swimmer and 12-time Olympic medalist, attended Bloomfield central school.
- William Ketchum, former mayor of Buffalo, New York
- Wayne Barker, Tony nominated composer for the musical Peter and the Starcatcher, graduated from Bloomfield High School.
- Kaitlyn Tiffany, staff writer for the Atlantic and author, graduated from Bloomfield High School in 2011.

== Economy ==
- Crosman Corporation is based in Bloomfield with their headquarters located on Highway 5.
- Other Half Brewing Company is located at 6621 State Route 5 & 20.
