= St. Peter's Episcopal Church (Bloomfield, New York) =

Historic church in New York, United States

- U.S. National Register of Historic Places
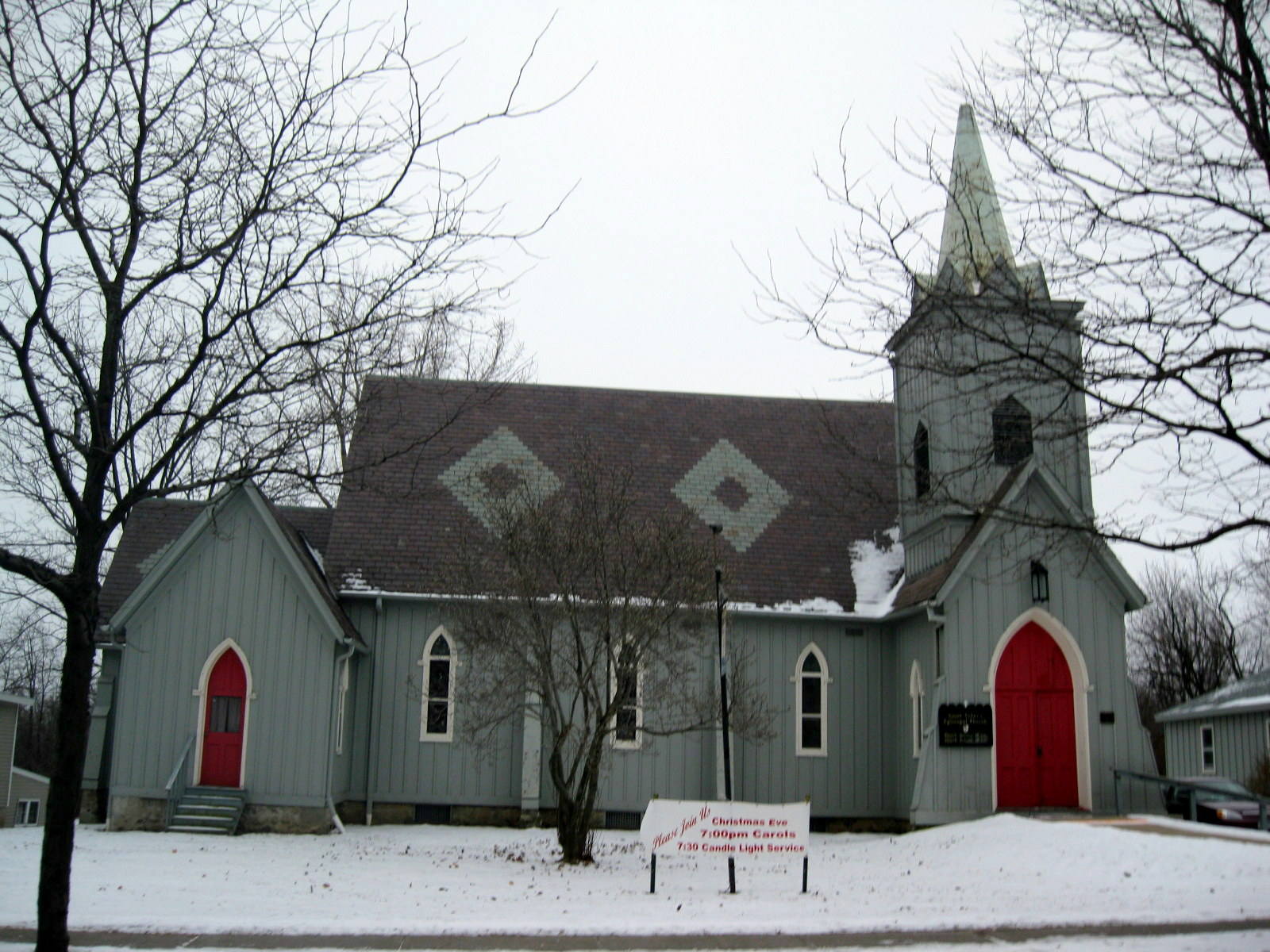
- St. Peter's Episcopal Church, December 2009

- Location within New York Location within the United States
- Location: 44 Main St., Bloomfield, New York
- Coordinates: 42°54′1″N 77°25′28″W
- Area: less than one acre
- Built: 1871
- Architect: Hastings, S.P.
- Architectural style: Carpenter Gothic
- NRHP reference No.: 96001389
- Added to NRHP: November 29, 1996

St. Peter's Episcopal Church is a historic Carpenter Gothic style Episcopal church located at 44 Main Street in Bloomfield, Ontario County, New York. Constructed in 1871, it is a small, board and batten, Carpenter Gothic style frame building. The 67 foot by 27 foot rectangular structure is surmounted by a sharply pitched gable roof featuring polychrome slate shingles set in a decorative diamond pattern. A square bell tower surmounted by a pyramidal spire is attached to the front corner of the main body of the church.

It was listed on the National Register of Historic Places in 1996.
