= Joseph G. Masten =

American politician (1809–1871)

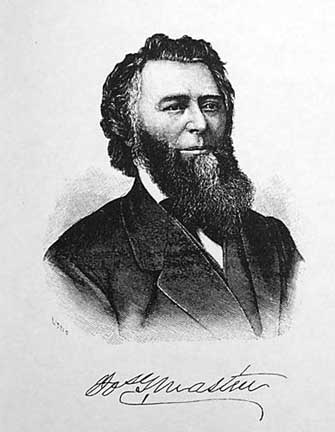

13th and 15th Mayor of Buffalo
- In office 1843–1844; 1845–1846
- Preceded by: George William Clinton, William Ketchum
- Succeeded by: William Ketchum, Solomon G. Haven

Personal details
- Born: June 24, 1809 Red Hook, New York
- Died: April 15, 1871 (aged 61) Buffalo, New York
- Party: Democratic
- Spouse: Christina Cameron
- Children: three children

Joseph Griffiths Masten (1809–1871) was Mayor of the City of Buffalo, New York, serving in 1843–1844 and 1845–1846.

== Biography ==
He was born in Red Hook, New York on June 24, 1809. He graduated from Union College in 1828, then went on to study law and pass the bar. In 1836 Masten moved to Buffalo and established a law practice. He and his wife, the former Christina Cameron, were the first civilian owners of the Wilcox Mansion on Delaware Avenue.

He accepted nomination as a Democratic candidate for Mayor in 1843 and was elected March 7, 1843. During his first term, the office of comptroller was created; Buffalo's Irish immigrants celebrated their first St. Patrick's day; and the ordnance requiring that sidewalks and gutters be kept free from snow and dirt was adopted. In 1845 he sought and won a second mayoral term. On March 10, 1846, Masten's last term as Mayor of Buffalo ended.

From 1856 until his death in 1871, Masten held the position of superior court judge, joining George W. Clinton and Isaac Verplanck for the larger portion of that time. He also served as a Justice in the 8th Judicial District of the State of New York. He was a founding councilman for the Medical School that became the University at Buffalo. The Masten City Council district is named after him. He died on April 15, 1871, and is buried in Forest Lawn Cemetery

Political offices
Preceded by George William Clinton	Mayor of Buffalo, NY; 1843–1844	Succeeded by William Ketchum
Preceded by William Ketchum	Mayor of Buffalo, NY; 1845–1846	Succeeded by Solomon G. Haven

Buffalo Mayor, March, 1843
Party	Candidate	Votes	%	±%
Democratic	Joseph G. Masten	1,639	57.8	−6.6
Whig	Walter Joy	1,197	42.2	+6.6

Buffalo Mayor, March, 1845
Party	Candidate	Votes	%	±%
Democratic	Joseph G. Masten	1,837	54.4	+8.0
Whig	Hiram Barton	1,538	45.6	−8.0
