= Tioga County Courthouse =

- U.S. National Register of Historic Places
- U.S. Historic district – Contributing property
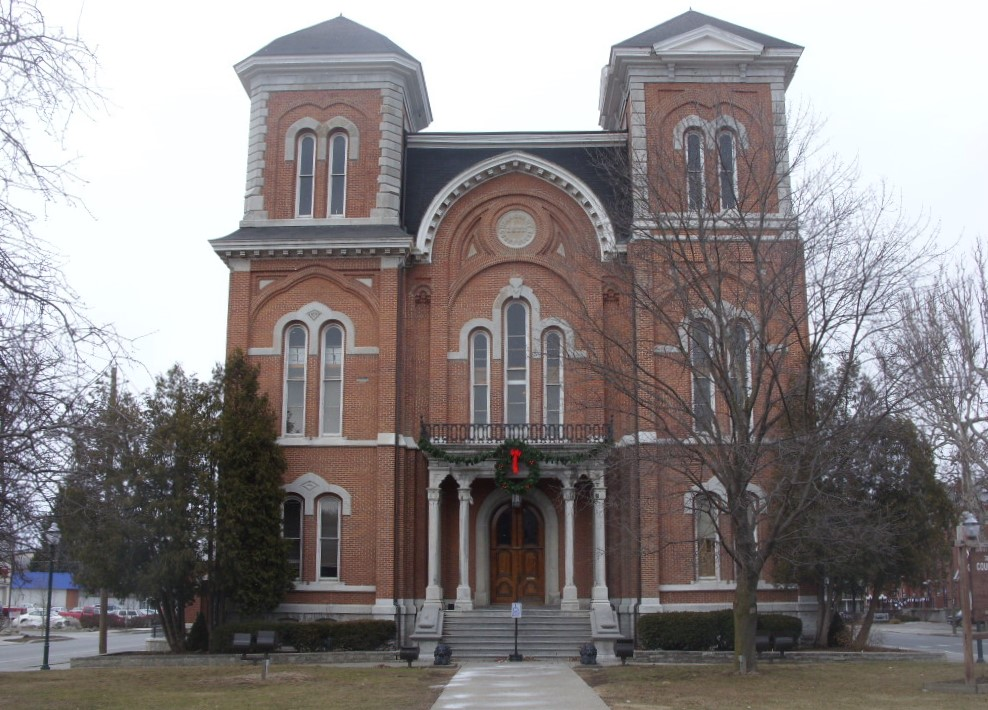
- Tioga County Courthouse, February 2009

- Location within New York Location within the United States
- Interactive map showing the location for Tioga County Courthouse
- Location: Village Park, Owego, New York
- Coordinates: 42°6′9″N 76°15′45″W
- Area: less than one acre
- Built: 1871
- Architect: Howe, Miles F.
- NRHP reference No.: 72000915
- Added to NRHP: December 26, 1972

Tioga County Courthouse is a historic courthouse located at Owego in Tioga County, New York. It was built in 1871–72 and is a rectangular two-story building with four three-story towers, one on each corner. It is constructed of smooth, hard-burned brick of a red-pink color with decorative limestone features.

It was listed on the National Register of Historic Places in 1972.
