= Hamer v. Sidway =

1891 New York contract law case

- Court: New York Court of Appeals
- Full case name: Louisa W. Hamer, Appellant, v. Franklin Sidway, as Executor, etc., Respondent.
- Argued: February 24, 1891
- Decided: April 14, 1891
- Citation: 124 N.Y. 538, 27 N.E. 256

Case history
- Prior history: Judgment for plaintiff, Supreme Court, July 1, 1890

Holding
- Respondent's forbearance of legal rights on the promises of future benefit made by Petitioner could constitute valid consideration.

Court membership
- Chief judge: William C. Ruger
- Associate judges: Charles Andrews, Robert Earl, Francis M. Finch, John Clinton Gray, Albert Haight., Alton Parker, J., Rufus Wheeler Peckham, Jr., Denis O'Brien

Case opinions
- Majority: Alton Parker, J., joined by unanimous

Hamer v. Sidway, 124 N.Y. 538, 27 N.E. 256 (N.Y. 1891), was a noted decision by the New York Court of Appeals, the highest court in the U.S. state of New York. It is an important case in American contract law by establishing that forbearance of legal rights (voluntarily abstaining from one's legal rights) on promises of future benefit made by other parties can constitute valid consideration (the element of exchange generally needed to establish a contract's enforceability in common law systems), and, in addition, unilateral contracts (those that benefit only one party) were valid under New York law.

== Background ==
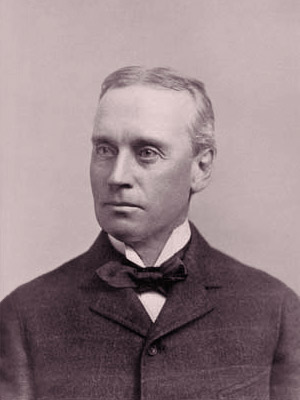
Franklin Sidway, the Defendant in Hamer v. Sidway

Louisa Hamer, the plaintiff, brought suit against Franklin Sidway, the executor of the estate of William E. Story I, the defendant, for the sum of $5,000. On March 20, 1869, William E. Story had promised his nephew, William E. Story II, $5,000 if the nephew would abstain from drinking alcohol, using tobacco, swearing, and playing cards or billiards for money until the nephew reached 21 years of age. Story II accepted the promise of his uncle and refrained from the prohibited acts until he turned the agreed-upon age. After celebrating his 21st birthday on January 31, 1875, Story II wrote to his uncle and requested the promised $5,000. The uncle responded to his nephew in a letter dated February 6, 1875 in which he told his nephew that he would fulfill his promise. Story I also stated that he preferred to wait until his nephew was older before actually handing over the extremely large sum of money. The elder Story also declared in his letter that the money owed to his nephew would accrue interest while he held it on his nephew's behalf. The younger Story consented to his uncle's wishes and agreed that the money would remain with his uncle until Story II became older.

Story I died on January 29, 1887, without having transferred any of the money owed to his nephew. Story II had meanwhile transferred the $5,000 financial interest to his wife, who had later transferred that financial interest to Louisa Hamer on assignment. The elder Story's estate refused to grant Hamer the money and believed there was no binding contract since there was a lack of consideration. As a result, Hamer sued the estate's executor, Franklin Sidway.

== Opinion of the court ==
The trial court ruled in favor of Hamer. This decision was reversed on appeal. The Court of Appeals, the highest court in New York, reversed and directed that the judgment of the trial court be affirmed, with costs payable out of the estate. Judge Alton Parker (later Chief Judge of the Court of Appeals), writing for a unanimous court, wrote that the forbearance of legal rights by Story II, namely the consensual abstinence from "drinking liquor, using tobacco, swearing, and playing cards or billiards for money until he should become 21 years of age" constituted consideration in exchange for the promise given by Story I. Because the forbearance was valid consideration given by a party (Story II) in exchange for a promise to perform by another party (Story I), the promiser was contractually obligated to fulfil the promise.

Parker cited the Exchequer Chamber's 1875 definition of consideration: "A valuable consideration in the sense of the law may consist either in some right, interest, profit or benefit accruing to the one party, or some forbearance, detriment, loss or responsibility given, suffered or undertaken by the other." The executor of Story I's estate, Sidway, was therefore legally bound to deliver the promised $5,000 to whoever currently held the interest in the sum, which by the time of the trial was Hamer.

== Influence ==
Hamer is very common reading in first-year contracts courses at American law schools. The view of contracts operative in Hamer was grounded in a particular theory of consideration, the "benefit-detriment theory" (as exemplified in the Exchequer Chamber's 1875 definition). However, since the early 20th century (especially as embodied in the First and Second Restatements of Contracts), a dominant view has been the "bargain theory", which is that a typical contract must consist of a bargained-for exchange which is an agreement in which each party provides a promise or performance in return for a promise or performance from the other. Thus, Hamer was decided on the basis of a legal theory that has largely been replaced or supplemented by newer theory and so similar cases may be viewed differently by contemporary courts.
