= Interior with Portraits =

Painting by Thomas Le Clear

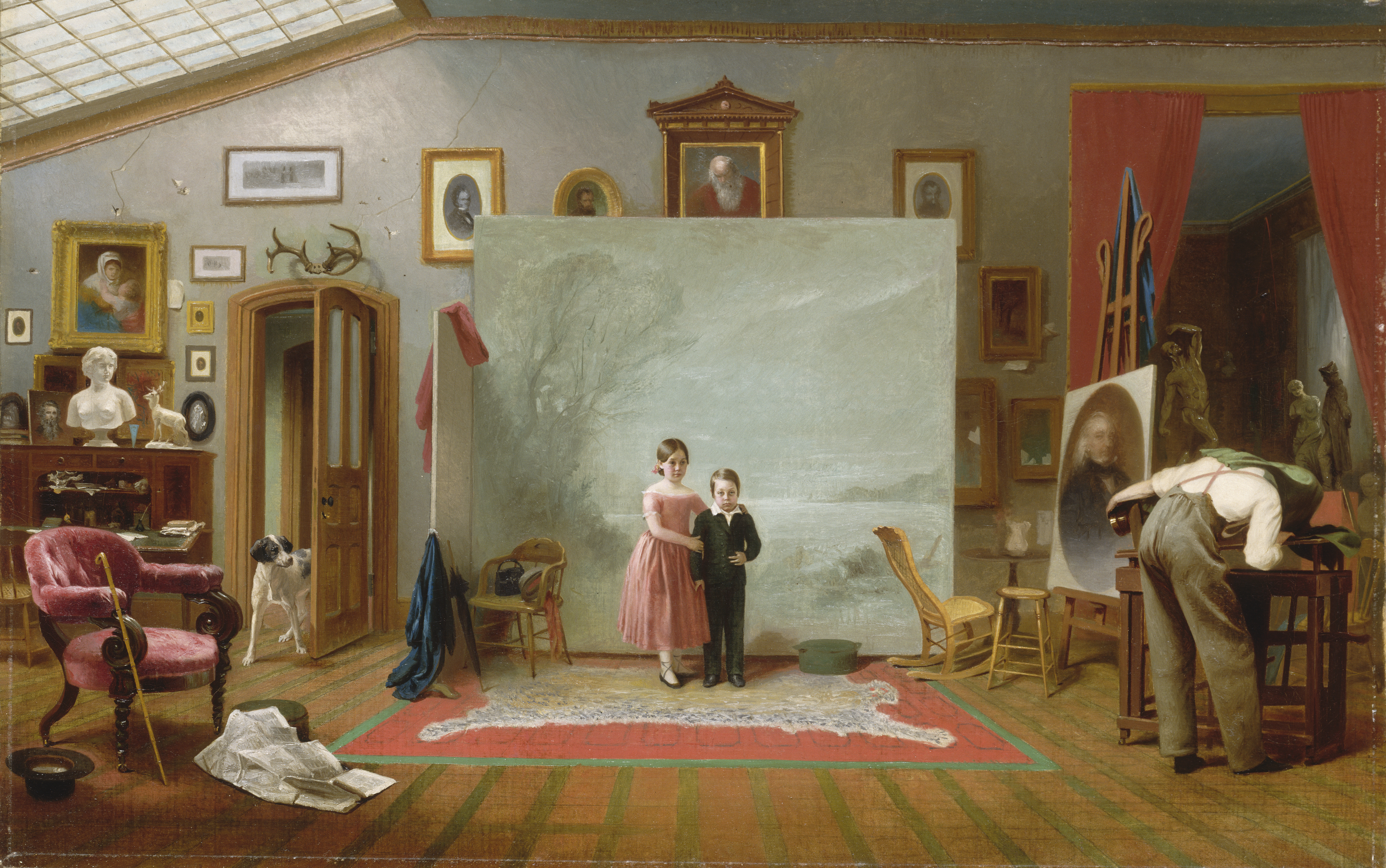
- Artist: Thomas Le Clear
- Year: 1865
- Medium: Oil on canvas
- Condition: On display
- Location: Smithsonian Museum of American Art; Washington, DC

Interior with Portraits is an 1865 genre scene painted by American artist Thomas Le Clear (1818–1882), commissioned by Franklin Sidway (1834–1920). It features Sidway's siblings, James and Parnell, posing for a photograph in an artist's studio. The children were painted posthumously based on family daguerreotypes, and the painting has been read as representing the tension between its medium and the emergent medium of photography. Interior with Portraits is currently held by the Smithsonian American Art Museum in Washington, D.C.

== About ==
The painting features two children, James and Parnell Sidway, posing for a photograph in an artist's studio. The painting was commissioned by the subjects' older brother, Franklin Sidway. Parnell was an adolescent when she died of illness in 1850, while James was a 26-year-old volunteer firefighter who died in a hotel fire shortly before the painting was commissioned.

The likenesses of the subjects as children were painted from family daguerreotypes. Some painters of the time regarded photography with suspicion, and refused to use photographs as references for portraits. The painting is filled with references to this tension. The children are surrounded by painted portraits, and the photographer's back is to the viewer with his face obscured. The girl appears to be supporting the boy and holding him still, as might have been necessary when posing a child for an early photograph due to the long exposure time. A dog is depicted just entering the studio, another acknowledgement of early photography's limitation to still subjects.

== Smithsonian Museum of American Art ==
The painting is currently owned by the Smithsonian American Art Museum and the purchase was made possible by a bequest of Pauline Edwards in 1993.

== See also ==
- Thomas Le Clear
- Franklin Sidway
