= Richard Stout =

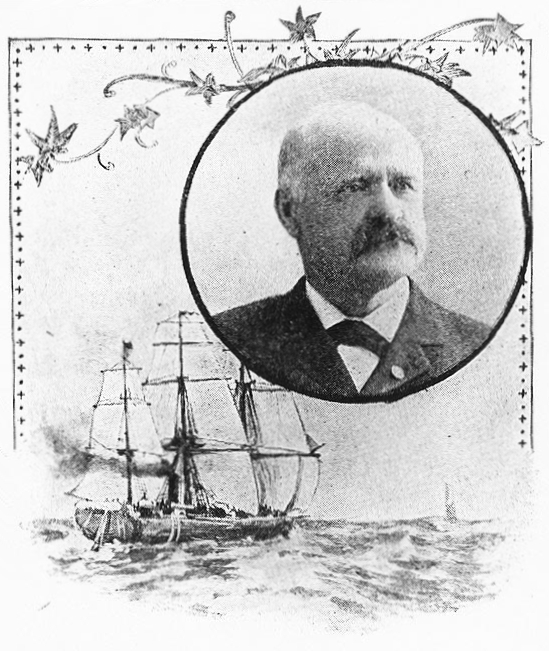
- Landsman Richard Stout
- Born: 19 Oct 1834; New York, US
- Died: August 6, 1896 (aged 59–60); Owego, New York, US
- Burial place: Evergreen Cemetery, Owego, New York
- Military career
- Allegiance: United States of America; Union
- Branch: United States Navy
- Rank: Landsman
- Unit: USS Isaac Smith
- Conflicts: American Civil War: Battle of Stono River
- Awards: Medal of Honor

Richard Stout (1836 – August 6, 1896) was a Union Navy sailor during the American Civil War and a recipient of the United States military's highest decoration, the Medal of Honor for his actions in an engagement with Confederate naval and land forces on the Stono River in South Carolina.

On January 30, 1863, Stout was serving as a Landsman on the USS Isaac Smith when his ship was ambushed and captured by Confederate forces while operating on the Stono River in South Carolina. For his conduct during this action, in which he was badly wounded, Stout was awarded the Medal of Honor on April 16, 1864.

Stout died at age 59 or 60 and was buried in Evergreen Cemetery, Owego, New York.

== Medal of Honor citation ==

Rank and Organization: Rank and organization: Landsman, U.S. Navy. Born: 1836, New York. Accredited to: New York. G.O. No.: 32, April 16, 1864.

Citation: Serving on board the U.S.S. Isaac Smith, Stono River, 30 January 1863. While reconnoitering on the Stono River on this date the U.S.S. Isaac Smith became trapped in a rebel ambush. Fired on from two sides, she fought her guns until disabled. Suffering heavy casualties and at the mercy of the enemy who was delivering a raking fire from every side, she struck her colors out of regard for the wounded aboard, and all aboard were taken prisoners. Carrying out his duties bravely through this action, Stout was severely wounded and lost his right arm while returning the rebel fire.

== See also ==
- List of Medal of Honor recipients
- List of American Civil War Medal of Honor recipients: Q–S
