= William Ketchum (mayor) =

American politician

14th Mayor of Buffalo
- In office 1844–1845
- Preceded by: Joseph G. Masten
- Succeeded by: Joseph G. Masten

Personal details
- Born: March 2, 1798 Bloomfield, New York
- Died: October 1, 1876 (aged 78) Buffalo, New York
- Party: Whig
- Spouse(s): Lamira Callendar; Elizabeth Palmer
- Children: 5
- "William Ketchum". Through The Mayor's Eyes, The Only Complete History of the Mayors of Buffalo, New York, Compiled by Michael Rizzo. The Buffalonian is produced by The Peoples History Union. May 27, 2009.

William Ketchum (March 2, 1798 – October 1, 1876) was the 14th Mayor of the City of Buffalo, New York. He served from 1844 to 1845.

== Biography ==
William Ketchum was born on March 2, 1798, in Bloomfield, New York. He moved to Buffalo in 1819, and became a partner at a merchant house that handled furs and hats. He was one of the founders of the original Bank of Buffalo along with Major Andre Andrews and Hiram Pratt.

Ketchum served as a Buffalo Village Trustee prior to the city's incorporation, and later served on the Erie County Board of Supervisors. On March 5, 1844, he ran successfully as the Whig candidate for mayor. He did not run for re-election in 1845. He was later a Republican and a Hindoo, a splinter group of the Republican Party.

In 1847, he patented the first practical lawn mower in the United States. In 1851 he was appointed Collector of the Port of Buffalo by President Millard Fillmore. He retired from the fur and hat business in 1857. In 1861, he patented the Ketchum Grenade, which was used by the Union Army during the American Civil War.

Later in life, he developed an interest in the history of Buffalo, New York, and wrote a two-volume history of early Buffalo.

== Personal life ==
On March 18, 1823, he married Lamira Callendar of Buffalo; she died in 1866 and he remarried on September 7, 1871, to Elizabeth Palmer of Brantford, Ontario. He died October 1, 1876, and is buried in the Ketchum family plot in Forest Lawn Cemetery.

== Electoral history ==
Buffalo Mayor, March, 1844
Party	Candidate	Votes	%	±%
Democratic	Oliver G. Steele	1,389	46.4	−11.4
Whig	William Ketchum	1,602	53.6	+11.4

== See also ==
- List of mayors of Buffalo, New York
- Ketchum Grenade

Political offices
Preceded by Joseph G. Masten	Mayor of Buffalo, New York; 1844–1845	Succeeded by Joseph G. Masten
