= Frank St. John Sidway =

American lawyer

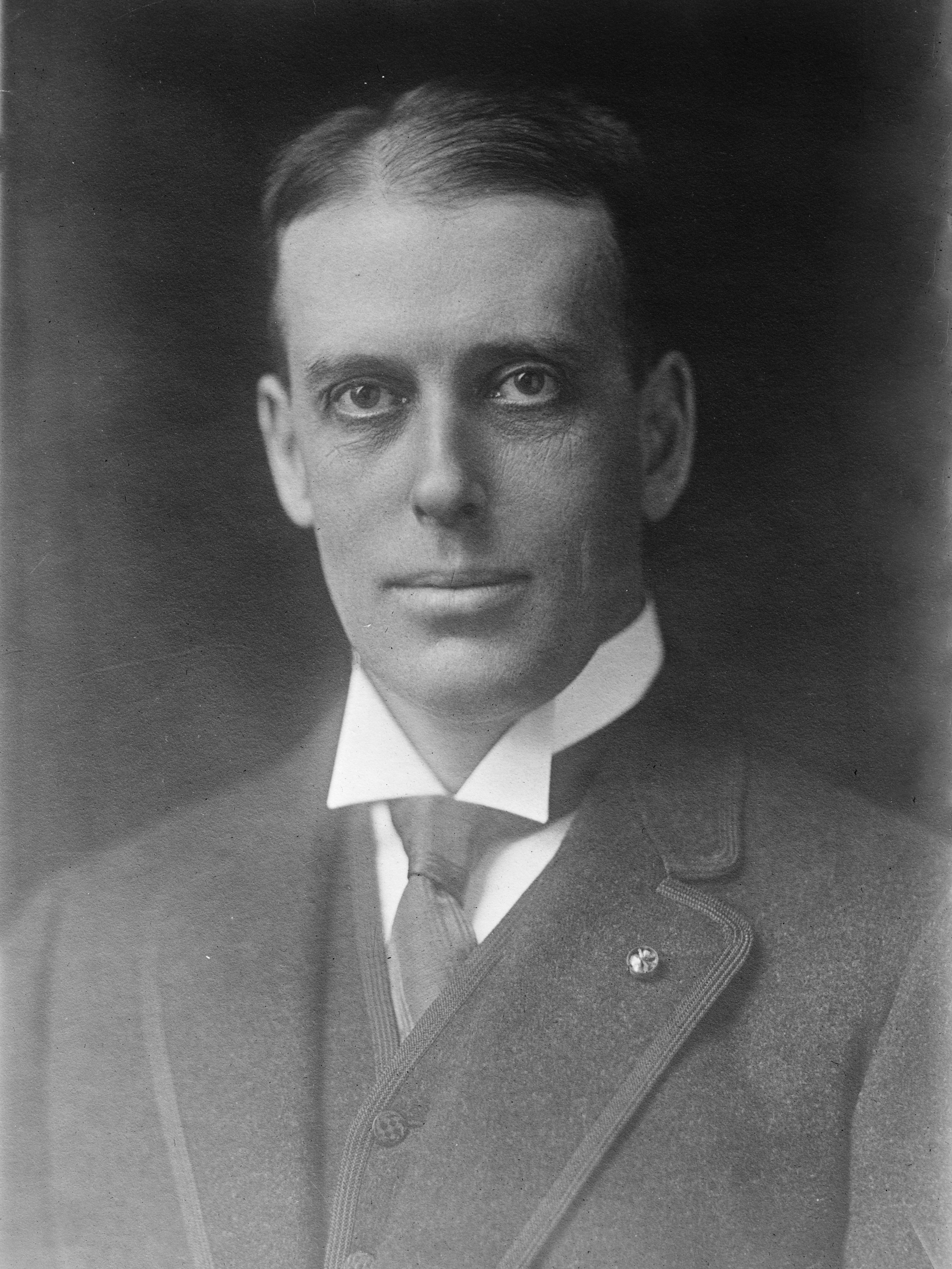

Chair of the Erie County Republican Party
- In office 1909–1910
- Preceded by: Fred Greiner
- Succeeded by: Herbert S. Sisson

Personal details
- Born: December 15, 1869 Buffalo, New York, US
- Died: January 17, 1938 (aged 68) Buffalo, New York, US
- Resting place: Forest Lawn Cemetery
- Spouse: Amelia Minirva (Roberts) Sidway (1881-1972)
- Children: 3
- Parent(s): Franklin Sidway (1834-1920); Charlotte Spaulding (1843-1934)
- Relatives: Elbridge G. Spaulding (grandfather); James A. Roberts (father-in-law)
- Education: Phillips Exeter Academy
- Alma mater: Harvard University; University at Buffalo Law School
- Known for: Chairman of the Erie County Republican Party

Frank St. John Sidway (December 15, 1869 – January 17, 1938), was a Buffalo, New York lawyer and National Guard leader. He also served as chairman of the Erie County Republican Party, and was a candidate for lieutenant governor in 1914.

== Early life ==
Sidway was born on December 15, 1869, to Franklin Sidway (1834–1920) and Charlotte Spaulding (d. 1934). Sidway was the grandson of Elbridge Gerry Spaulding (1809–1897), who was a lawyer, banker, and politician. Spaulding supported the idea for the first U.S. currency not backed by gold or silver, thus helping to keep the Union economy afloat during the Civil War. Sidway's siblings were: Harold Spaulding Sidway (b. 1868), who married Mary Chase, Edith Sidway (1872–1958), who married William Allen Gardner (1869–1941), Clarence Spaulding Sidway (1877–1953), who married Genevieve Clark Hingston (1880–1939), and Ralph Huntington Sidway (1884–1936), who married Stephana Ostrom (Barnum) Sidway (1882–1962).

Sidway attended Phillips Exeter Academy then Harvard University, graduating in 1893. After Harvard, he attended University at Buffalo Law School, graduating in 1894.

== Career ==
After Harvard, he worked in the American Exchange Bank and the Farmers and Mechanics Bank of Buffalo. After graduating from Law School, he studied with the law firm of Lewis, Moot & Lewis, until his admission to the bar in 1894. After being admitted to the bar, he practiced in the office of Sprague, Moot, Sprague & Brownell until 1897. In 1897, he left Sprague, Moot, Sprague & Brownell and went out on his own, establishing his own practice focusing primarily on real estate. As an attorney, he was responsible for all Sidway family interests in Buffalo, including the management of the Sidway building at Main and Goodell Streets.

=== Military career ===
March 1, 1894, he was commissioned as second lieutenant in the Seventy-fourth infantry regiment of the New York National Guard. On December 15, 1898, also his 29th birthday, he was commissioned a captain of the 202nd New York Volunteer Infantry and set sail for Cuba as part of the Spanish–American War. His regiment was the first body of United States troops to enter Cuba where he served throughout the campaign. In 1902, he resigned from the regiment.

In 1917, fourteen years after he resigned, he was again commissioned major of the depot battalion of the Seventy-fourth. On December 6, 1917, when the United States entered World War I, he was promoted to lieutenant colonel of that regiment and led in organizing the command that took the place of the regular regiment after its departure for a mobilization camp.

== Personal life ==
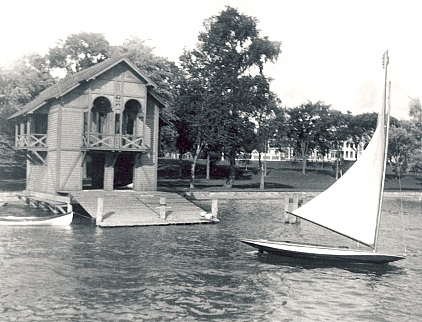
Elbridge G. Spaulding's boathouse on his "River Lawn" estate on Grand Island, New York

On April 16, 1903, Sidway married Amelia Minirva Roberts (1881–1972), the daughter of James A. Roberts, former comptroller of the state of New York. They lived at 37 Oakland Place in Buffalo, and together, they had three daughters:

- Margaret St. John Sidway, who married James Kent Averill (living in Norfolk, Virginia in 1938)
- Edith Sidway, who married Stevan I. Stevens (living in New York City in 1938)
- Martha Sidway, who married Roger K. Adams (living in Buffalo, New York in 1938)

He served as department commander of the United Spanish War Veterans and a member of the Naval and Military Order of the Spanish–American War. In Buffalo, he served as president the Main Street Association, Inc. (1936–1937), president of the Buildings Manufacturers Association (1926–1927), vice-president of the Robertson Cataract Electric Company, and was chairman of the Erie County Republican Committee from 1909 to 1910. He was also a member of the Buffalo Club, Saturn Club and the Ellicott Club of Buffalo, a life member of the Buffalo Library, the Buffalo Fine Arts Academy, and the Buffalo Historical Society.

Sidway died in Buffalo on January 17, 1938. He is interred at Forest Lawn Cemetery.

=== Boathouse ===
In the late 1930s, Sidway moved the now-NRHP listed Spaulding-Sidway Boathouse in Grand Island, New York about 270 feet northwest to his property in order to save the boathouse from demolition when the Spaulding estate was acquired in order to become Beaver Island State Park.
