= Thomas Le Clear =

American painter

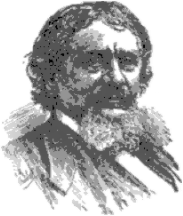
- Born: March 11, 1818; Owego, New York
- Died: November 26, 1882 (aged 64); Rutherford, New Jersey
- Occupation: Painter

Thomas Le Clear (March 11, 1818 – November 26, 1882) was an American painter.

== Biography ==
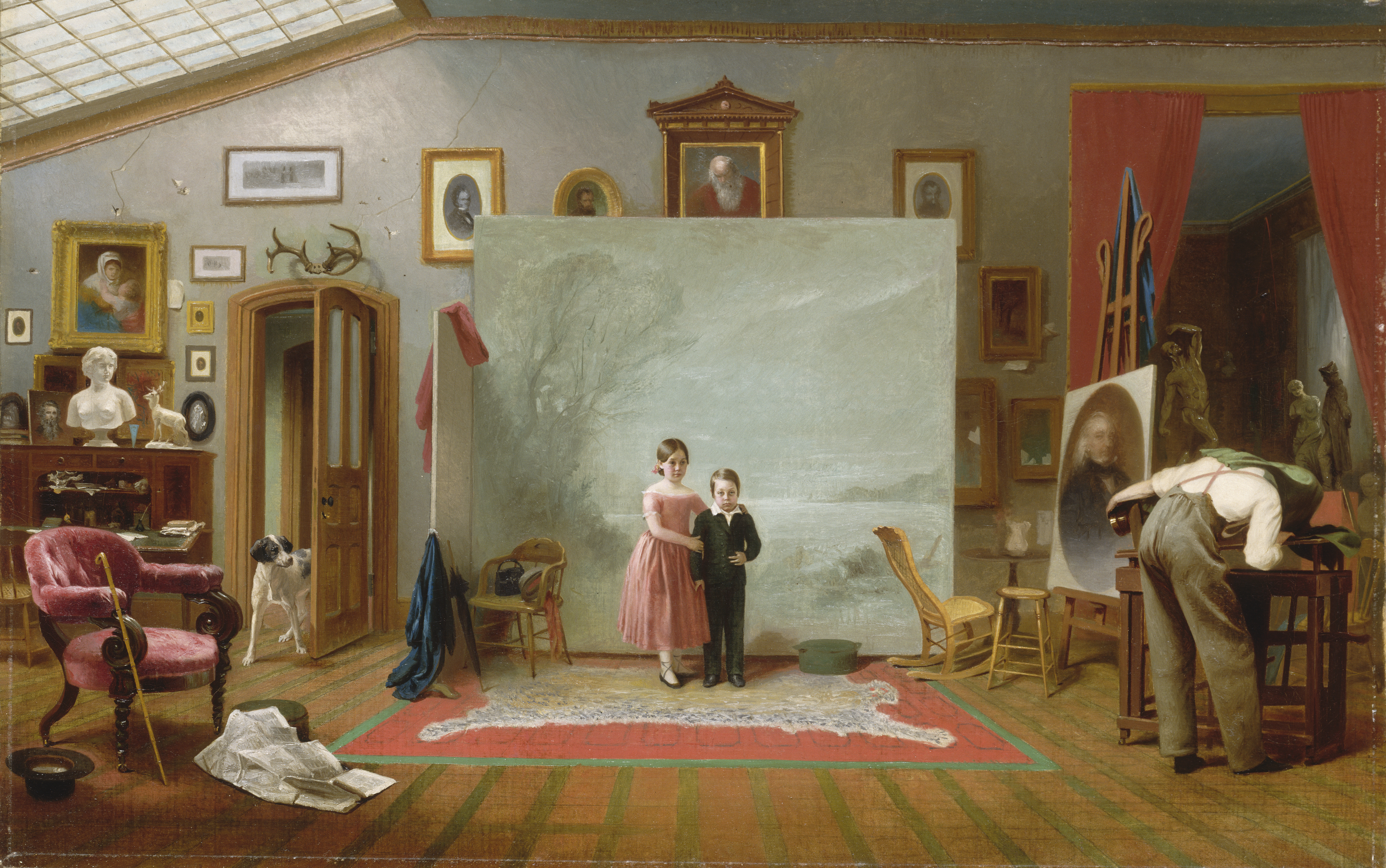
Interior with Portraits, 1865, Smithsonian Museum of American Art

Thomas Le Clear was born in Owego, New York on March 11, 1818. He sold his first paintings, copies of a painting of Saint Matthew, at the age of 12. He began to follow art professionally before he had had any instruction. He continued to teach himself by studying the painting by other artists. When he was fourteen, in 1832, he moved to London, Canada, with his father. He painted portraits there for a time. He painted portraits in Elmira, and in Rochester, before moving to New York City in 1839, when he was twenty-one. There he studied for several years under Henry Inman. From 1844 to 1860, he resided in Buffalo, where he was a founding member of the Buffalo Fine Arts Academy. He returned to New York City in the early 1860s, and was elected a National Academician in 1863.

Le Clear died of pleurisy on November 26, 1882, at his home in Rutherford, New Jersey, at the age of 64.

== Works ==
Among his compositions are The Reprimand, Marble Players, and Itinerants (1862). Of his numerous portraits, one of the best is that of George Bancroft, at the Century Club, New York; other excellent portraits are those of William Cullen Bryant, Bayard Taylor, Millard Fillmore, and Edwin Booth as Hamlet. He's also noted for his genre scenes, including Interior with Portraits.
