= Elliott (surname) =

Elliott is a surname, and may refer to:

== A ==
- Aaron Marshall Elliott (1844–1910), American novelist and academic
- Abby Elliott (born 1987), American actress and comedian
- Adam Elliott (born 1994), Australian rugby league footballer
- Aileen Mary Elliott (1896–1966), British artist
- Al Elliott (Alvah Charles Elliott) (1894–1975), American baseball and football player
- Alan Elliott (1925–2006), Australian rules footballer
- Alasdair Elliott, British operatic tenor
- Albert Elliott (1869–1900), English rugby union player
- Alecia Elliott (born 1982), American country music singer
- Alex Elliott (born 1987), Canadian soccer player
- Alex Elliott (footballer, born 1905) (1905–1988), Scottish footballer
- Alexander Calvin Elliott (1831–1905), United States soldier and Medal of Honor recipient
- Alexander Leslie Elliott (1902–1975), Canadian lawyer and politician from Ontario
- Alfred Elliott (1828–1915), Church of Ireland bishop
- Alfred J. Elliott (1895–1973), American farmer, newspaperman and politician from California
- Alice Elliott, American documentary filmmaker
- Alice Gordon Elliott (1886–1977), Australian nurse and community worker
- Alice Ivy Elliott (1950–2015), Ghanaian ballet teacher and choreographer
- Alicia Elliott (born 1987/8), Canadian Tuscarora writer and editor
- Alison Elliott (born 1970), American actress
- Allen Elliott (1897–1979), American baseball player
- Amanda Elliott (born 1989), British tennis player
- Andrea Elliott, American journalist
- Andrew Charles Elliott (1829–1889), Canadian politician, 4th Premier of British Columbia
- Andy Elliott (born 1963), English footballer
- Anthony Elliott (born 1981), English rugby union footballer
- Anthony Blacker Elliott (1887–1970), Anglican bishop in south India
- Archie Elliott Jr., American lawyer and judge
- Archie Elliott, Lord Elliott (1922–2008), Scottish lawyer and judge
- Arthur Elliott (footballer) (1870-?), English footballer
- Arthur Elliott (photographer) (1870–1938), South African photographer
- Arthur G. Elliott Jr. (1916–2003), American politician from Michigan
- Aussie Elliott (1914–1934), American outlaw

== B ==
- Barry Elliott (1944–2018) and Paul Elliott (born 1947), the Chuckle Brothers, British comedians
- Ben Elliott (c.1952–2020), American record producer
- Ben Elliott (footballer) (born 2002), English footballer
- Ben T. Elliott (born 1944), American writer, head of speechwriting for Ronald Reagan
- Beth Elliott (born 1950), American folk singer, activist and writer
- Bill Elliott (born 1955), American racing driver
- Bill Elliott (musician) (William F. Elliott, born 1951), American pianist, bandleader and composer
- Bill Elliott (rugby league) (William Ernest Elliott) (1882–1975), Australian rugby league footballer
- Bill Elliott (soccer), American college soccer coach
- Billy Elliott (footballer) (1925–2008), English footballer and manager
- Blake Elliott (born 1981), American football player
- Bob Elliott (baseball) (1916–1966), American baseball player
- Bob Elliott (basketball) (born 1955), American basketball player and television sportscaster
- Bob Elliott (comedian) (1923–2016), American comic performer
- Bob Elliott (medical researcher) (1934–2020), New Zealand medical researcher
- Bob Elliott (politician) (1927–2013), member of the Legislative Assembly of Alberta
- Bob Elliott (sportswriter) (born 1949), Canadian sports columnist
- Bobby Elliott (born 1941), English rock drummer with The Hollies
- Bonnie Elliott, Australian cinematographer
- Brenda Elliott (born 1950), Canadian politician from Ontario
- Brennan Elliott (born 1975), Canadian actor
- Brett Elliott (born 1982), American college football player and coach
- Brian Elliott (born 1985), Canadian ice hockey goaltender
- Brian Elliott (writer) (1910–1991), Australian literary academic
- Bridey Elliott (born 1990), American actress, writer and film director
- Brooke Elliott (born 1974), American actress and singer
- Bruce Elliott (bridge), Canadian bridge player
- Bruce Elliott (footballer) (born 1956), Australian rules footballer
- Bruce Elliott (writer) (1914–1973), American writer
- Bruce Elliott-Smith, British songwriter and producer
- R. Bruce Elliott (born 1949), American actor and voice actor
- Bryan Elliott (1930–2015), English speedway rider
- Bryn Elliott (1925–2019), English footballer
- Brynn Elliott (born 1994), American singer-songwriter
- Bump Elliott (1925–2019), American college footballer, coach and athletic director
- Burt Elliott (1947–2024), American politician from South Dakota
- Byron Elliott (1835–1913), American judge

== C ==
- Carl Elliott (1913–1999), American politician from Alabama
- Carl Elliott (philosopher) (born 1961), American philosopher
- Carlton Elliott (1927–2005), American football player
- Carleton Elliott (1928–2003), Canadian composer
- Carolyn Elliott, American occultist
- Carter Elliott (1893–1959), American baseball player
- Casey Elliott (1974–1996), American race car driver
- Cathy Elliott (1957–2017) was a Canadian Mi'kmaq artist, musician, composer and playwright
- Chad Allen Elliott (born 1974), American singer-songwriter and artist
- Chad James Elliott, American songwriter and record producer
- Charity Elliott (born 1969), American basketball coach
- Charlie Elliott (1912–2004), English cricketer
- Charles Elliott (Australian politician) (1870–1938), Western Australian politician
- Charles Elliott (footballer) (1896–1940), English footballer
- Charles Elliott (New Zealand politician) (1811–1876), New Zealand politician
- Charles Alfred Elliott (1835–1911), Lieutenant Governor of Bengal
- Charles Boileau Elliott (1803–1875), English cleric and travel writer
- Charles Irving Elliott (1892–1972), aviator in the Hawaiian Islands
- Charles Loring Elliott (1812–1868), American portrait painter
- Charles B. Elliott (1861–1935), American jurist
- Charles W. Elliott (1943–2023), Canadian First Nations woodcarver
- C. Thomas Elliott (Charles Thomas Elliott) (born 1939), English physicist
- Charles Henry Elliott-Smith (1889–1994), Royal Air Force officer
- Charlie Elliott (jockey) (Edward Charles Elliott, 1904–1979), British jockey
- Charlotte Elliott (1789–1871), English poet and hymn writer
- Charlotte Elliott (botanist) (1883–1974), American plant physiologist
- Chase Elliott (William Clyde Elliott II) (born 1995), American racing driver, son of Bill Elliott
- Chaucer Elliott (1878–1913), Canadian sportsman
- Cheri Elliott (born 1970), American BMX racer
- Chip Elliott, American network engineer
- Chris Elliott (Christopher Nash Elliott) (born 1960), American actor
- Chris Elliott (food scientist) (Christopher Elliott) (fl. 2000s–2020s,) food security academic
- Chris Elliott (footballer) (1953–2017), Australian rules footballer
- Chris Elliott (politician) (Thomas Christopher Elliott, fl. 2000s–2010s), American politician from Alabama
- Christian Elliott (born 1997), American sport shooter
- Christie Elliott (born 1991), English footballer
- Christine Elliott (born 1955), Canadian lawyer and politician
- Christopher Haslett Elliott (born 1947), British Army officer (South Wales Borderers, Royal Regiment of Wales)
- Christopher Leslie Elliott (born 1947), British Army officer (Royal Engineers)
- Christy Elliott (1951–2011), Irish boxer
- Chuck Elliott (1921–1980), American football player
- Claude Elliott (baseball) (1876–1923), American baseball player
- Claude Elliott (schoolmaster) (1888–1973), British headmaster
- Clive Elliott (1945–2018), British ornithologist and civil servant
- Clive Elliott (barrister), New Zealand barrister
- Clyde E. Elliott (1885–1959), American film director, producer and writer
- Col Elliott (born 1949), Australian stand-up comedian
- Coya Elliott, American sound editor
- Craig Elliott (born 1971), American illustrator and visual artist in animation
- Cyril Elliott (1890–1977), Church of Ireland cleric

== D ==
- Daisy Elliott (1917–2015), American politician and realtor from Michigan
- Damon Elliott (born 1973), American record producer, songwriter and composer
- Daniel Elliott (Indiana politician), Indiana state representative
- Daniel Elliott (Kentucky politician) (born 1984), Kentucky state representative
- Danny Elliott (footballer) (born 1995), English footballer
- Dave Elliott (American football) (born 1952), American football player and coach
- Dave Elliott (footballer, born 1945), English footballer and manager
- Dave Elliott (footballer, born 1968), Scottish footballer
- David Elliott (children's author) (born 1947), American author of children's books
- David Elliott (college president) (1787–1874), president of Washington College, 1830–1831
- David Elliott (curator) (born 1949), British art curator and writer
- David Elliott (diplomat) (1930–2023), British diplomat
- David Elliott (musician), publisher, and founder of York House Recordings
- David Elliott (palaeontologist) (born 1957), Australian palaeontologist
- David Elliott (poet) (1923–1999), Canadian poet
- David Elliott (politician) (born 1970), Australian member of the New South Wales Legislative Assembly
- David Elliott (professor), professor of technology policy at the Open University
- David James Elliott (born 1960), Canadian actor
- David J. Elliott (born 1948), Canadian music education philosopher
- Dawn Elliott, American biomedical engineer
- Dean Elliott (1917–1999), American television and film composer
- DeAndre Elliott (born 1992), American football player
- Debbie Elliott, American broadcast journalist
- Della Elliott (1917–2011), Australian trade unionist
- Denholm Elliott (1922–1992), British actor
- Deni Elliott (born 1953), American ethicist
- Dennis Elliott (born 1950), British musician and artist
- DeShon Elliott (born 1997), American football player
- Desmond Elliott (1930–2003), British publisher and literary agent
- Devaughn Elliott (born 1991), Kittian footballer
- Dick Elliott (1886–1961), American character actor
- Dick Elliott (politician) (1935–2014), American politician from South Carolina
- Dickey Elliott (born 1955), South African cricketer
- Doc Elliott (Wallace John Elliott) (1900–1976), American football player
- Dominique Elliott (born 1991), American basketball player
- Don Elliott (1926–1984), American jazz multi-instrumentalist
- Donald B. Elliott (1931–2024), member of the Maryland House of Delegates
- Donald R. Elliott, visual effects artist
- Donald H. Elliott (1932–2021), American urban planner
- Donnie Elliott (born 1968), American baseball pitcher
- Doreen Elliott (1908–1966), British skier
- Dorothy Elliott (1896–1980), British trade unionist and feminist
- Doug Elliott (born 1962), Canadian musician
- Douglas Elliott (skier) (born 1950), British cross-country skier
- Douglas Hemphill Elliott (1921–1960), member of the U.S. House of Representatives
- Drew Elliott (born 1981), American fashion businessperson
- Duong Van Mai Elliott (born 1941), Vietnamese author, writer and translator
- Dyan Elliott (born 1954), Canadian medievalist

== E ==
- Ebenezer Elliott (1781–1849), English poet
- Edna Elliott-Horton (1904–1994), Sierra Leonean activist
- Ed Elliott (born 1985), English sculptor
- Edward Bishop Elliott (1793–1875), English clergyman and pre-millenarian writer
- Edward C. Elliott (Edward Charles Elliott) (1874–1960), American educational researcher and administrator
- Edward E. Elliott (1911–1993), American politician from California
- Edward Elliott (songwriter) (c.1800–1867), English writer of popular humorous songs
- Edwin Bailey Elliott (1851–1937), English mathematician
- Edythe Elliott (1886–1978), American character actress
- Elaine Elliott, American basketball coach
- Elicser Elliott, Canadian visual artist
- Eliot V. Elliott (1902–1984), Australian trade union leader
- Elizabeth Elliott (paediatrician), Australian clinician scientist
- Elizabeth Elliott (romance author), American novelist
- Elizabeth Anne Elliott (1918–2001), American petroleum geologist
- Elmer B. Elliott (1902–1960), American politician from Florida
- Emily Louise Orr Elliott (1867–1952), Canadian artist and fashion illustrator
- E. S. Elliott (Emily Steele Elliott) (1836–1897), English religious writer
- Emory Elliott (1942–2009), American academic
- Emun Elliott (born 1983), Scottish actor
- Erick Arc Elliott (born 1988), American rapper and record producer
- Ern Elliott (1900–1980), Australian rules footballer
- Ernie Elliott (1943/4–1972), Northern Irish loyalist activist
- Ezekiel Elliott (born 1995), American football player

== F ==
- Fiona Smith (Elliott), English badminton medalist
- Florence Elliott (1905–1996), Northern Irish nurse
- Frances Reed Elliott (1892–1965), African-American Red Cross Nurse
- Francis Elliott (archdeacon), Archdeacon of Berbice, Guyana from 1908 to 1911
- Francis Elliott (journalist), British journalist
- Francis Perry Elliott (1861–1924), American writer and educator
- Frank Elliott (actor) (1880–1970), English actor
- Frank Elliott (cyclist) (1911–1964), Canadian Olympic cyclist
- Frank Elliott (footballer) (1929–2018), Welsh footballer
- Frank Elliott (police officer) (1874–1939), assistant commissioner of the London Metropolitan Police
- Frank Elliott (racing driver) (1891–1959), American racecar driver
- Frank R. Elliott (1877–1931), Canadian hardware merchant and political figure in Nova Scotia
- Frank Worth Elliott Jr. (1924–1997), United States Air Force general
- Fraser Elliott (1921–2005), Canadian lawyer and businessman
- Fred Elliott (1903–1982), Canadian ice hockey player
- Fred Elliott (footballer) (1879–1960), Australian rules footballer
- Freda Elliott, Northern Ireland lawn bowler
- Frederick Wellington Elliott (1873–1933), Canadian farmer and political figure in Ontario

== G ==
- Gail Elliott (born 1966), British model and fashion designer
- Gene Elliott (1889–1976), American baseball player
- Geoff Elliott (1931–2014), English athlete
- Geoff Elliott (footballer) (born 1939), Australian rules footballer
- George Elliott (American football) (born 1932), American quarterback and coach
- George Elliott (Australian rules footballer) (1885–1917), with Melbourne University Football Club
- George Elliott (bishop) (born 1949), Canadian suffragan bishop
- George Elliott (British politician) (1847–1925), Member of Parliament for Islington West
- George Elliott (Canadian politician) (before 1800 – 1844), Irish-born member of Legislative Assembly of Upper Canada
- George Elliott (Canadian writer) (1923–1996), Canadian journalist and short story author
- George Elliott (cricketer) (1850–1913), English cricketer
- George Elliott (footballer, born 1889) (1889–1948), British footballer
- George Elliott (spy) (before 1555 – after 1581), English agent
- George Elliott (surgeon) (c.1636–1668), English military doctor
- George Adam Elliott (1875–1944), Canadian farmer and politician from Ontario
- George A. Elliott (born 1945), Canadian mathematician
- George F. Elliott (1846–1931), American major general, Marine Corps Commandant
- George P. Elliott (1918–1980), American poet, novelist and essayist
- G. H. Elliott (George Henry Elliot) (1882–1962), British music hall singer and dancer
- Gerald Elliott (1907–1982), British screenwriter
- Gerell Elliott (born 1970), American soccer player
- Gerri Elliott, American business executive
- Gertrude Elliott (1874–1950), American stage actress
- Gideon Elliott (1828–1869), Australian cricketer
- Gilbert Elliott (1843–1895), American Confederate Army officer and shipbuilder
- Gilbert Elliott (cricketer) (1870–?), Barbadian cricketer
- Glenn Elliott (baseball) (1919–1969), American baseball pitcher
- Glenn Elliott (footballer) (born 1950), Australian rules footballer
- Glenn Elliott (politician) (born 1971), American politician
- Gordon Elliott (journalist) (born 1956), British-Australian journalist and broadcaster
- Gordon Elliott (racehorse trainer) (born 1978), Irish racehorse trainer
- Grace Elliott (c.1754–1823), Scottish courtesan, writer and spy
- Grandpa Elliott (1944–2022), street musician in New Orleans
- Grant Elliott (born 1979), New Zealand cricketer
- Granville Elliott (1713–1759), British Army general
- Greenidge Elliott (1861–1895). Barbadian cricketer
- Greg Elliott, New Zealand yacht designer
- Gregory Elliott, American politician from Mississippi
- Gwendolyn J. Elliott (1945–2007), American police officer and non-profit founder

== H ==
- Hal Elliott (Harold William Elliott, 1899–1963), American baseball player
- Hank Elliott (born 1936), American politician and judge from Georgia
- Harold Elliott (American football) (1931–2005), American football coach
- Harold Elliott (artist) (1890–1968), Canadian painter
- Harold Elliott (Australian Army officer) (1878–1931), Australian Major General and politician
- Harold Elliott (cricketer) (1904–1969), English cricketer
- H. A. Elliott (Harold A. Elliott, 1890–1939), American lawyer and attorney from Arizona
- Harriet Elliott (1884–1947), American political scientist
- Harrison S. Elliott (1882–1951), American Methodist minister
- Harry Elliott (baseball) (1923–2013), American baseball player
- Harry Elliott (English cricketer) (1891–1976), English wicket keeper
- Harry Elliott (New Zealand cricketer) (1870–1941), New Zealand cricketer
- Harry Elliott (wrestler) (John Harrison Elliott) (1904– 2006), American professional wrestler and promoter
- H. Chandler Elliott (Harry Chandler Elliott) (1909–1978), Canadian-American physician and writer
- Harvey Elliott (born 2003), English footballer
- Helen Elliott (born 1949), Filipino swimmer
- Helene Elliott, American sportswriter
- Henry Elliott (athlete) (born 1946), French high jumper
- Henry Venn Elliott (1792–1865), English divine
- Henry Wood Elliott (1846–1930), American watercolor painter, author, and environmentalist
- Henry Wood Elliott II (1920–1976), American physician and pharmacologist
- Henry S. Elliott (1858–1942), American attorney and politician
- Herb Elliott (born 1938), Australian middle-distance runner
- Herbert Elliott (1877–1973), English schoolmaster and cricketer
- Hillary Elliott (born 1998), Canadian modern pentathlete
- Hilton Elliott (1885–1960), Australian politician
- Howard Elliott (Missouri politician) (1904–1985), American lawyer and politician from Missouri
- Howard Elliott (railroad executive) (1860–1928), American company presiden
- Howard Leslie Elliott (1877–1956), New Zealand Baptist minister, sectarian agitator and editor
- Howard R. Elliott, U.S. railroad executive and official
- Hugh Elliott (diplomat) (born 1965), British ambassador
- Sir Hugh Elliott, 3rd Baronet (1913–1989), British conservationist and ornithologist

== I ==
- Ian Elliott (born 1938), British rower
- Ida Beasley Elliott (1864–1948), American missionary to Burma
- Inger McCabe Elliott (1933–2024), Norwegian-American businesswoman, photographer and artist
- Irene Dillard Elliott (1892–1978), American academic
- Isaac H. Elliott (1837–1922), Union Army officer of the American Civil War
- Ivan A. Elliott (1889–1990), American lawyer and politician

== J ==
- Jack Elliott (broadcaster), American radio personality
- Jack Elliott (composer) (1927–2001), American television and film music composer
- Jack Elliott (footballer) (born 1995), English footballer
- Jack Elliott (racing journalist) (1922–2007), Australian horse racing journalist
- Jack Elliott (rugby union) (1871–1938), Wales international rugby union player
- Ramblin' Jack Elliott ( Elliott Charles Adnopoz, born 1931), American folk singer
- Jake Elliott (born 1995), American football placekicker
- Jalen Elliott (born 1998), American football player
- Jamelle Elliott (born 1974), American women's basketball coach
- James Elliott, Jr., founder of the Phi Gamma Delta fraternity in 1848
- James Elliott (curler), Scottish wheelchair curler
- James Elliott (actor) (1928–2011), Australian actor and tipstaff
- James Elliott (footballer) (1869–1899), English footballer
- James Elliott (medical administrator) (1880–1959), New Zealand medical doctor and writer
- James Elliot (politician) (1775–1839), Vermont congressman
- James B. Elliott (1849–1931), American freethinker
- James Douglas Elliott (1859–1933), American judge
- James Dudley Elliott, Australian judge
- James L. Elliot (1943–2011), American astronomer and scientist
- James Philip Elliott (1929–2008), British physicist
- James T. Elliott (1823–1875), U.S. Representative from Arkansas
- J. Robert Elliott (James Robert Elliott) (1910–2006), U.S. federal judge and Georgia state representative
- James William Elliott (1833–1915), English composer and collector of nursery-rhymes
- Jamie Elliott (footballer, born 1973), Australian rules footballer
- Jamie Elliott, Australian rules footballer for Collingwood
- Jamie Elliott (rugby union) (born 1992), English rugby union player
- Jamin Elliott (born 1979), American football player
- Jane Elliott (born 1933), American teacher and anti-racism activist
- Jane Elliott (choreographer) (born 1970), American dancer and choreographer
- Jane Elliott (sociologist) (born 1966), British academic
- Janet A. W. Elliott (born 1967), Canadian thermodynamics researcher
- Janice Elliott (1931–1995), English writer and journalist
- Jannion Steele Elliott or Steele-Elliott (1871–1942), British ornithologist and naturalist
- Jared Elliott, American college football coach
- Jason Elliott (ice hockey) (born 1975), Canadian ice hockey player
- Jason Elliott (politician) (born 1970), American politician
- Javien Elliott (born 1993), American football player
- Jayrone Elliott (born 1991), American football player
- Jehu Elliott (1813–1876), American politician and judge from Indiana
- Jennifer Elliott (born c.2001), Australian golfer
- Jere Elliott (born 1946), American alpine skier
- Jerritt Elliott (born 1968), American volleyball coach
- Jerry Elliott (1936–2010), American judge
- Jerry C. Elliott (born 1943), American physicist
- Jesse Elliott (1782–1845), United States naval officer
- Jim Elliott (born 1942), American politician from Montana
- Jim Elliott (American football) (born 1944), American football player
- Jimmy Elliott (1838–1883), Irish-American champion boxer
- Jimmy Elliott (footballer) (1891–?), English footballer and manager
- Jo Eleanor Elliott (1923–2011), American nurse
- Joanne Elliott (1925–2023), American mathematician
- Joe Elliott (born 1959), British lead singer for the band Def Leppard
- Joe Elliott (footballer) (fl.1900), English footballer
- Joel Elliott (1840–1868), Union Army officer of the American Civil War
- Joey Elliott (born 1986), American football quarterback
- John Elliott (actor) (1876–1956), American actor
- John Elliott (architect) (1936–2010), English architect
- John Elliott (artist) (1858–1925), English artist
- John Elliott (British boxer) (1901–1945), British boxer of the 1920s
- John Elliott (businessman) (1941–2021), Australian businessman and prominent Liberal
- John Elliott (cricketer) (born 1942), English cricketer
- John Elliott (defensive lineman) (1944–2010), American football player
- John Elliott (electronic musician) (born 1984), American electronic musician
- John Elliott (Georgia politician) (1773–1827), U.S. Senator from Georgia
- John Elliott (golfer) (born 1963), American golfer
- John Elliott (Jamaican boxer) (1931–2015), Jamaican boxer
- John Elliott (judge) (1546–1617), Irish judge
- John Elliott (New Zealand politician) (1938–2022), New Zealand politician
- John Elliott (physician) (fl. 1690), adherent of James II
- John Elliott (wrestler) (1934–1997), Australian Olympic wrestler
- John Banks Elliott (1917–2018), Ghanaian diplomat
- John Bardoe Elliott (1785–1863), British civil servant in Indi.
- John C. Elliott (1919–2001), Governor of American Samoa
- John Campbell Elliott (1872–1941), Canadian lawyer and politician
- John F. Elliott (1920–1991), American professor of metallurgy
- J. H. Elliott (John Huxtable Elliott, 1930–2022), British historian
- John Innes Elliott (1912–1989), British architect
- John H. Elliott (biblical scholar) (1935–2020), American New Testament scholar
- John M. Elliott (unionist) (1913–1988), American labor union leader
- John M. Elliott Jr. (active since 1970), makeup artist
- John Milton Elliott (1820–1879), American lawyer, politician and judge from Kentucky
- John S. Elliott (1889–1950), American football player and coach
- Jon Elliott (born 1947), American business executive and radio broadcaster
- Jonathan Elliott (born 1962), American composer
- Jordan Elliott (born 1997), American football player
- Josh Elliott (born 1971), American television journalist
- Josh Elliott (politician) (born 1984), American businessman and politician from Connecticut
- Joyce Elliott (born 1951), American politician from Arkansas
- Judith Elliott, Canadian judge in Manitoba
- Julia Elliott, American fiction writer
- Julia Anne Elliott (1809–1841), English poet and hymnwriter
- Julian Elliott (born 1955), British academic and educational psychologist
- Julie Elliott (born 1963), British politician
- Jumbo Elliott (American football) (John Stuart Elliott, born 1965), American football player
- Jumbo Elliott (coach) (James F. Elliott) (1915–1981), American athletics coach
- Jumbo Elliott (baseball) (James Thomas Elliott) (1900–1970), American baseball pitcher

== K ==
- Kate Elliott (actress) (born 1981), New Zealand television and film actress
- Kate Elliott (writer) (born 1958), American fantasy and science fiction writer
- Katia Elliott (born 1970), Swedish journalist
- Keith Elliott (1916–1989), New Zealand soldier and Victoria Cross recipient
- Keith Elliott (politician), American politician from Missouri
- Ken Elliott (1922–2006), New Zealand rugby union footballer
- Kevin Elliott (born 1988), American gridiron football player
- Keyshaun Elliott (born 2003), American football player
- Kiana Elliott (born 1997), Australian weightlifter
- Kieran Elliott (born 1995), Australian cricketer
- Kieron Elliott, Scottish actor
- Kweku Elliott (born 1980), Ghanaian actor
- Kyle Elliott, Canadian ornithologist and academic

== L ==
- Larry Elliott (born 1955), English journalist and author
- Larry Elliott (American football) (1935–2008), American football and baseball coach
- L. M. Elliott (Laura Malone Elliott), American author
- Lauren Elliott, American video game designer
- Laurie Elliott (born 1971), Canadian actress, television writer and stand-up comedian
- Leighton Elliott (born 1984), Caymanian footballer
- Lenvil Elliott (1951–2008), American football player
- Leon Elliott (born 2006), Barbadian footballer
- Leonard Elliott (1905—1989), American actor and comedian
- Leonard Elliott Elliott-Binns (1885–1963), English historian and theologian
- Leonie Elliott (born 1988), English actress
- Lesley Elliott (campaigner) (1946–2022), New Zealand nurse and activist
- Lesley Elliott (field hockey) (born 1960), New Zealand field hockey player
- Lexie Elliott, Scottish mystery and thriller author
- Lilian Elliott (1874–1963), British writer and anthropologist
- Lillian Elliott (1874–1959), Canadian stage and film actress
- Lillian Elliott (textile designer) (1930–1994), American textile designer
- Lin Elliott (born 1968), American football placekicker
- Lisa Elliott, English gymnast
- Lloyd Hartman Elliott (1918–2013), American academic
- Lorne Elliott, Canadian comedian, musician, author and playwright
- Lorraine Elliott (1943–2014), Australian politician
- Louise Elliott (born 1969), Welsh broadcaster and journalist
- Lucy Elliott (born 1994), New Zealand actress
- Lyla Elliott (1934–2017), Australian politician
- Lu Elliott (1924–1987), American jazz and blues singer

== M ==
- Mabel Elliott (1885–1944), British postal censor
- Mabel Evelyn Elliott (1881–1968), British-American physician and humanitarian
- Maddison Elliott (born 1998), Australian swimmer
- Madge Elliott (1896–1955), Australian dancer and actor
- Malachi Leo Elliott (1886–1967), American architect
- Malcolm Elliott (born 1961), English professional cyclist
- Malcolm T. Elliott (1946–2019), Australian broadcaster and journalist
- Manaia Elliott (born 2005), New Zealand association footballer
- Mara Elliott (born 1968), American lawyer and politician
- Marc Elliott (born 1979), English actor
- Marcus Elliott (born 1984), American basketball player and coach
- Margaret Elliott (born 1951), Northern Irish solicitor and businesswoman
- Marianne Elliott (director) (born 1966), British theatrical director
- Marianne Elliott (historian) (born 1948), British historian of Ireland
- Marianne Joan Elliott-Said, performing as Poly Styrene, (1957–2011), British musician
- Marina Elliott, Canadian biological anthropologist
- Mark Elliott (boxer) (born 1966), British boxer
- Mark Elliott (British author) (born 1963), British travel author
- Mark Elliott (footballer) (born 1959), Welsh footballer
- Mark Elliott (musician) (born 1967), American country singer and songwriter
- Mark Elliott (voice-over artist) (1939–2021), American voice-over artist for the Walt Disney Company
- Mark C. Elliott, American professor of Chinese and Asian history at Harvard University
- Mark W. Elliott (active from 2007), scholar of religion at the University of St Andrews
- Martin Elliott (born 1951), British surgeon
- Martin Elliott (photographer) (1946–2010), British photographer
- Marvin Elliott (born 1984), Jamaican football player
- Mary Ann Elliott (born 1943), American business executive and philanthropist
- Mary Elizabeth Elliott (1923–1976), Canadian plant pathologist and mycologist
- Matt Elliott (American football) (born 1968), American football player
- Matt Elliott (footballer) (born 1968), Scottish footballer
- Matt Elliott (musician), founder of The Third Eye Foundation
- Matt Elliott (sports executive) (born 1976/7), American college athletic director
- Matt Elliott (writer) (born 1969), New Zealand author
- Matthew Elliott (cricketer) (born 1971), Australian cricketer
- Matthew Elliott (loyalist) (c.1739–1814), British agent in the American Revolution and War of 1812
- Matthew Elliott (rugby league) (born 1964), Australian rugby league footballer and coach
- Matthew Elliott, Baron Elliott of Mickle Fell (born 1978), British political strategist and lobbyist
- Maud Howe Elliott (1854–1948), American novelist
- Maurice Elliott (1942–1996), Scottish footballer
- Max Elliott (rugby union) (1929–1988), Australian rugby union footballer
- Maxine Elliott (1868–1940), American actress and theater proprietor
- Michael Elliott (disambiguation), multiple people
- Mike Elliott (disambiguation), multiple people
- Milton Courtright Elliott (1879–1928), American lawyer and judge
- Missy Elliott (born 1971), American hip hop singer
- Morrie Elliott (born 1935), Australian rules footballer
- Mortimer Fitzland Elliott (1839–1920), American politician from Pennsylvania

== N ==
- Nelson Elliott (1925–2017), Canadian politician
- Neville Elliott-Cooper (1889–1918), British Army officer, recipient of the Victoria Cross
- Nicholas Elliott, (1916–1994), British intelligence officer
- Nick Elliott (born 1955), British photographer
- Noah Elliott (born 1997), American paralympic snowboarder
- Noel Elliott (1947–2021), Irish rugby union player
- Norbert Elliott (born 1962), Bahamian athlete and coach
- J. Norman Elliott (Joseph Norman Elliott) (1894–1959), American sports coach and otolaryngologist

== O ==
- Obadiah Elliott (1763–1838), British inventor
- Orvil Elliott (1885–1954), Canadian gymnast
- Osborn Elliott (1924–2008), American editor of Newsweek magazine
- Otto Buchanan Elliott (1886–1979), Canadian politician

== P ==
- Patricia Elliott (1938–2015), American actress
- Paul Elliott (born 1947), English comedian, one of the Chuckle Brothers
- Paul Elliott (cinematographer) (born 1947), American cinematographer
- Paul Elliott (epidemiologist) (born 1954), professor of epidemiology and public health medicine
- Paul Elliott (footballer) (born 1964), British football defender
- Paul Elliott (politician) (born 1954), Australian politician
- Paul Elliott (rugby league) (born 1960), Australian rugby league player
- Paul Mark Elliott, British actor
- Pearl Elliott (1887–1935), American procuress
- Pete Elliott (Peter R. Elliott, 1926–2013), American football coach
- Peter Elliott (bishop) (1943–2025), Australian Roman Catholic auxiliary bishop of Melbourne
- Peter Elliott (British actor) (born 1956), actor specializing in ape roles
- Peter Elliott (Canadian priest) (born 1954), Anglican dean of New Westminster
- Peter Elliott (English priest) (born 1941), Anglican archdeacon of Northumberland
- Peter Elliott (New Zealand actor) (born 1956 or 1957), New Zealand actor
- Peter Elliott (pharmacologist) (born 1958), British pharmacologist and drug developer
- Peter Elliott (runner) (born 1962), English middle-distance runner
- Peter D. T. A. Elliott (born 1941), American mathematician
- Peter J. Elliott (1930–2016), British actor and stunt performer
- Phil Elliott (born 1960), British comic book creator
- Preston Elliott (1875–1939), Canadian farmer and politician from Ontario

== R ==
- Ralph Elliott (1921–2012), German-born Australian professor of English, runologist
- Ralph Nelson Elliott (1871–1948), American accountant and author who developed the Wave Principle
- Randal Elliott (1922–2010), New Zealand eye surgeon
- Randy Elliott (born 1951), American baseball player
- Ray Elliott (cricketer) (1917–1997), Australian cricketer
- Ray Elliott (footballer) (born 1929), Welsh footballer
- Ray Elliott (rugby union) (1897–1977), Australian rugby union player
- Renée Elliott (born 1964), American CEO
- Richard Elliott (organist), principal organist of the Mormon Tabernacle Choir
- Richard C. Elliott (1945–2008), American multimedia artist
- Richard M. Elliott (1887–1969), American psychologist
- Richard N. Elliott (1873–1948), U.S. Representative from Indiana
- Ricky Elliott (born 1965), American racing driver
- Rob Elliott (born 1969), Australian television presenter
- Robbie Elliott (born 1973), English footballer
- Robert Elliott (actor, born 1879) (1879–1951), American character actor
- Robert Elliott (actor, born 1944) (1944–2004), American character actor
- Robert Elliott (Australian rules footballer) (born 1953), Australian rules footballer
- Robert Elliott (chaplain) (before 1755 – after 1809), Scots-Irish Presbyterian clergyman in the United States
- Robert Elliott (fencer) (born 1950), Hong Kong Olympic fencer
- Robert Elliott (New Hampshire politician), American politician
- Robert Elliott (priest) (1658–1735), Irish Anglican priest
- Robert Elliott (songwriter) (before 1840 – after 1880), English poet from Northumberland
- Robert Elliott (Victorian politician) (1884–1950), Australian senator
- Robert B. Elliott (1842–1884), American politician from South Carolina
- R. Bruce Elliott (Robert Bruce Elliott, born 1949), American actor and voice actor
- Robert Ellsworth Elliott (1901–1981), Canadian politician
- Robert G. Elliott (1874–1939), American executioner based in New York
- Robert J. Elliott (born 1940), Canadian mathematician
- Robert W. B. Elliott (1840–1887), bishop of West Texas in the Episcopal Church
- Robert Elliott-Cooper (1845–1942), British civil engineer
- Rod Elliott (born 1951), Australian rules footballer
- Rodney Elliott (born 1960), American politician from Massachusetts
- Roger Elliott (governor) (1665–1714), governor of Gibraltar
- Roger Elliott (physicist) (1928–2018), British theoretical physicist
- Roger Elliott (politician) (1949–2021), American politician from Kansas
- Ron Elliott (musician) (born 1943), American musician, composer and record producer
- Ron Elliott (politician), Canadian politician
- Ronnie Elliott (artist) (1910–1982), American sculptor and collagist
- Ronnie Elliott (rugby union) (born 1952), Irish rugby union player
- Rosie Elliott (born 1997), New Zealand sprinter
- Ross Elliott (1917–1999), American character actor
- Ross Elliott (journalist) (1929–2000), Australian journalist and politician
- Rowdy Elliott (Harold Bell Elliott, 1890–1934), American baseball player
- Rowley Elliott (1877–1944), Northern Ireland Unionist politician
- Russ Elliott (1918–1988), Australian rules footballer
- Russell C. Elliott (1842–1898), Union Army soldier of the American Civil War
- Ryan Elliott (cyclist) (born 2004), Australian track cyclist
- Ryan Elliott (hurler) (born 1997), Irish hurler

== S ==
- Sam Elliott (born 1944), American actor
- Sam Elliott (cricketer) (born 2000), Australian cricketer
- Samantha D. Elliott (born 1975), American lawyer and judge
- Samantha Jo Elliott (born 2001), American beauty pageant titleholder
- Samuel Elliott (1860–1933), Australian pastoralist and politician
- Samuel Mackenzie Elliott (1811–1875) was a Scottish-American medical doctor, Union Army soldier and abolitionist
- Sarah Elliott (charity manager) (born 1982), British charity manager
- Sarah Elliott (cricketer) (born 1982), Australian cricket player
- Sarah Elliott (speed skater) (born 1982), American speed skater
- Sarah Barnwell Elliott (1848–1928), American novelist
- Sean Elliott (born 1968), American basketball player and sportscaster
- Shaun Elliott (born 1957), English footballer
- Shawn Elliott (actor) (1937–2016), American actor and singer
- Shawn Elliott (American football) (born 1973), American football player and coach
- Shay Elliott (1934–1971), Irish road bicycle racer
- Shayne Elliott (born 1963), New Zealand banker
- Shirley Elliott (1916–2004), Canadian librarian
- Sid Elliott (1915–1986), Australian rugby league footballer
- Sidney Elliott (1908–1986), English footballer
- Simon Elliott (born 1974), New Zealand soccer player and manager
- Simon G. Elliott (1828–1897), American surveyor, cartographer and railroad promoter
- Sophie Elliott, New Zealand murder victim
- Stefan Elliott (born 1991), Canadian ice hockey player
- Steph Elliott (born 1990), English field hockey player
- Stephan Elliott (born 1964), Australian film director and screenwriter
- Stephen Elliott Jr. (1830–1866), Confederate general of the American Civil War
- Stephen Elliott (actor), (1918–2005), American actor
- Stephen Elliott (author) (born 1971), American author and activist
- Stephen Elliott (bishop) (1806–1866), American Episcopal Church bishop
- Stephen Elliott (botanist) (1771–1830), American legislator, banker, educator and botanist
- Stephen Elliott (footballer) (born 1984), Irish international footballer
- Sterling Elliott (1852–1922), American inventor
- Steve Elliott (footballer, born 1958), English footballer
- Steve Elliott (footballer, born 1978), English footballer
- Steven Elliott (born 1995), Australian wheelchair basketball player
- Stewart Elliott (born 1965), Canadian-American jockey
- Stick Elliott (1934–1980), American stock car racing driver
- Stuart Elliott (footballer, born 1977), English footballer
- Stuart Elliott (footballer, born 1978), Northern Ireland footballer
- Stuart Elliott (drummer) (born 1965), English rock and session drummer
- Sumner Locke Elliott (1917–1991), Australian-American novelist and playwright
- Susan Elliott (academic) (born 1958), Australian academic in medical education
- Susan Elliott (judge) (born 1953), Canadian judge
- Susan J. Elliott (born 1956), American psychologist
- Susan M. Elliott, American diplomat
- Sydney Elliott (1902–1987), British newspaper editor

== T ==
- Ted Elliott (footballer) (1919–1984), English football player
- Ted Elliott (screenwriter) (born 1961), American screenwriter
- Ted Elliott (umpire) (Edward Hudspeth Elliott, 1851–1885), Australian cricketer and umpire
- Theyre Lee-Elliott (1903–1988), English visual artist
- Thomas Elliott III, birth name of Thomas Jane (born 1969), actor
- Thomas Elliott (Australian cricketer) (1879–1939), Australian cricketer
- Thomas Elliott (footballer) (1890–1955), English footballer
- Thomas Elliott (New Zealand cricketer) (1867–?), New Zealand cricketer
- Thomas Elliott (RAF officer) (1898–?), World War I British flying ace
- Thomas Renton Elliott (1877–1961), British physician and physiologist
- Sir Thomas Elliott, 1st Baronet (1854–1926), English civil servant
- Tim Elliott (born 1986), American mixed martial artist
- Tim Elliott (footballer) (born 1976), Australian rules footballer
- Tim Elliott (geochemist), British academic
- Tobias Elliott (born 2003), English rugby union footballer
- Tom Elliott or C. Thomas Elliott (born 1939), British scientist
- Tom Elliott (Australian footballer) (1901–1974), Australian rules footballer
- Tom Elliott (cricketer, born 1991) (born 1991), English cricketer
- Tom Elliott (footballer, born 1990), English footballer
- Tom Elliott (radio personality) (born 1967), Australian investment banker and radio presenter
- Tom Elliott, Baron Elliott of Ballinamallard (born 1963), Northern Irish politician
- Tony Elliott (American football coach) (born 1979), head coach for the University of Virginia
- Tony Elliott (defensive back) (born 1964), American football player
- Tony Elliott (defensive lineman) (1959–2007), American football player
- Tony Elliott (footballer) (born 1969), English football goalkeeper
- Tony Elliott (politician) (born 1944), Australian politician
- Tony Elliott (publisher) (1947–2020), British founder of Time Out
- Trevor Elliott (1937–2019), Australian rules footballer
- Trevor Elliott (geoscientist) (1949–2013), British geologist

== V ==
- Vanessa Elliott, Australian geologist
- Vernon Elliott (1912–1996), British bassoonist, conductor and composer
- Victor A. Elliott (1839–1899), American judge of the Colorado Supreme Court
- Violet Elliott (1899–1977), Australian comedian, singer and actress
- Virgil Elliott (born 1944), American oil painter
- Virginia Elliott (born 1955), British equestrian competitor

== W ==
- Wade Elliott (born 1978), British football player and coach
- W. H. Elliott (Wallace Harold Elliott) (1884–1957), British Anglican cleric
- Ward Elliott (1937–2022), American political scientist
- Warren Elliott (born 1979), Jamaican chess player
- Warren Grice Elliott (1848–1906), American railroad executive
- Washington Lafayette Elliott (1825–1888), Union Army officer of the American Civil War
- Walter Elliott (priest) (1842–1928), American Roman Catholic priest
- Walter Elliott (sound editor) (1903–1984), American sound editor
- Wild Bill Elliott (1904–1965), American film actor
- Will Elliott (born 1979), Australian horror fiction writer
- Will Hoskin-Elliott (born 1993), Australian rules footballer
- William Elliott (American politician) (1838–1907), U.S. congressman from South Carolina
- William Elliott (actor, born 1879) (1879–1932), American stage and film actor
- William Elliott (actor, born 1934) (1934–1983), American stage and film actor
- William Elliott (cricketer) (1842–1891), English cricketer
- William Elliott (engraver) (1727–1766), English engraver
- William Elliott (Ontario politician) (1872–1944), member of the Canadian House of Commons
- William Elliott (painter) (fl.1774–1810), Royal Navy officer and marine painter
- William Elliott (Peel MP) (1837–1888), member of the Canadian House of Commons
- William Elliott (RAF officer) (1898–1979), World War I flying ace
- William Elliott (rower) (1849–?), English professional sculling champion
- William Elliott (Saskatchewan politician) (1863–1934), member of the Northwest Territories legislature and Saskatchewan assembly
- William Elliott (Upper Canada politician) (1775–1867), politician in Upper Canada
- William Elliott (writer) (1788–1863), American sportsman and writer from South Carolina
- William A. Elliott, American art director
- William Henry Elliott (1792–1874), British general
- William Herbert Elliott (1872–?), businessman and political figure in Ontario
- William J. S. Elliott, Commissioner of the Royal Canadian Mounted Police
- William M. Elliott (c. 1811–1882), American politician
- William Yandell Elliott (1896–1979), American historian and political advisor
- Robert William Elliott, Baron Elliott of Morpeth (1920–2011), British politician

== Y ==
- Yannick Elliott (born 1986), Jamaican cricketer

== Z ==
- Zena Elliott (born 1975), New Zealand multidisciplinary artist
- Zetta Elliott (born 1972) is a Canadian-American poet, playwright and author

== See also ==
- Elliott sisters, Irish Nationalist duo
- Eliot (surname)
- Eliott (surname)
- Eliott (surname)
