= Raymond Elliott =

Raymond Elliott may refer to:

- Ray Elliott (cricketer) (1917–1997), Australian cricketer
- Ray Elliott (rugby union) (1897–1977), Australian rugby union player
- Ray Elliott (footballer) (born 1929), Welsh footballer
- Raymond L. Elliott, geologist and namesake of Elliott Nunatak

== See also ==
- Ray Elliot (disambiguation)
