= George Elliott =

George Elliott may refer to:

== Politicians ==
- George Elliott (Canadian politician) (before 1800–1844), Irish-born member of Legislative Assembly of Upper Canada
- George Elliott (British politician) (1847–1925), MP for Islington West, 1918–1922
- George Adam Elliott (1875–1944), Canadian member of House of Commons and Legislative Assembly of Ontario

== Sportsmen ==
- George Elliott (cricketer) (1850–1913), English right-handed batsman
- George Elliott (Australian rules footballer) (1885–1917), with Melbourne University Football Club
- George Elliott (footballer, born 1889) (1889–1948), Middlesbrough FC centre forward / inside right
- George Elliott (American football) (born 1932), quarterback, halfback and coach

== Writers ==
- George P. Elliott (1918–1980), American poet, novelist and essayist
- George Elliott (Canadian writer) (1923–1996), reporter, editor and short story author
- George A. Elliott (born 1945), Canadian mathematician specializing in operator algebras

== Others ==
- George Elliott (spy) (before 1555–after 1581), English confidence man, a/k/a George Eliot, who arrested Edmund Campion
- George Elliott (surgeon) (c. 1636–1668), English military doctor
- George F. Elliott (1846–1931), American major general, Marine Corps Commandant
- George Elliott (bishop) (born 1949), Canadian suffragan bishop

== Ships ==
- USS George F. Elliott (AP-13)
- USS George F. Elliott (AP-105)

== See also ==
- George Augustus Eliott, 1st Baron Heathfield (1717–1790), British Army officer
- George Eliot (disambiguation)
- George Elliot (disambiguation)
