= Susan Elliott =

Susan Elliott may refer to:

- Susan Elliott (academic) (born 1958), Australian academic specialising in medical education
- Susan J. Elliott (born 1956), American author, media commentator, and lawyer
- Susan M. Elliott (fl. 2010s), president and CEO of the National Committee on American Foreign Policy
- Susan Elliott (judge) (born 1953), Canadian judge
