= Paul Elliott =

Paul Elliott may refer to:

- Paul Elliott (politician) (born 1954), Australian former politician
- Paul Elliott (cinematographer) (born 1947), American cinematographer
- Paul Elliott (footballer) (born 1964), British football defender
- Paul Elliott (epidemiologist) (born 1954), professor of epidemiology and public health medicine
- Paul Mark Elliott, British actor
- Paul Elliott (born 1947), English comedian and one of the Chuckle Brothers
- Paul Elliott (baseball), Australian baseball coach, Baseball at the 2004 Summer Olympics
- Paul Elliott (rugby league) (born 1960), former Australian rugby league player

== See also ==
- Paul Elliott Martin (1897–1975), American bishop
