= John Elliott =

John Elliott may refer to:

== Entertainment ==
- John Elliott (artist) (1858–1925), English artist
- John Elliott (actor) (1876–1956), American actor
- John M. Elliott Jr. (active since 1970), makeup artist
- John Elliott (electronic musician) (born 1984), American electronic musician

== Politics ==
- John Elliott (Georgia politician) (1773–1827), U.S. senator from Georgia
- John Elliott (Missouri politician), legislator from Missouri
- John Milton Elliott (1820–1879), legislator from Kentucky
- John Campbell Elliott (1872–1941), Canadian lawyer and politician
- John Banks Elliott (1917–2018), Ghana's ambassador to the USSR
- John C. Elliott (1919–2001), governor of American Samoa
- John Elliott (New Zealand politician) (1938–2022), New Zealand politician

== Sports ==
- John S. Elliott (1889–1950), American football coach
- John Elliott (British boxer) (1901–1945), British boxer of the 1920s
- John Elliott (Jamaican boxer) (1931–2015), Jamaican boxer
- John Elliott (wrestler) (born 1934), Australian Olympic wrestler
- John Elliott (cricketer) (born 1942), English cricketer
- John Elliott (defensive lineman) (1944–2010), American football defensive tackle
- John Elliott (golfer) (born 1963), American professional golfer
- Jumbo Elliott (American football) (John Elliott, born 1965)

== Other ==
- John Elliott (physician) (fl. 1690), adherent of James II
- John Elliot (railway manager) (1898–1988), Chairman of London Transport
- John M. Elliott (unionist) (1913–1988), American labor union leader
- John F. Elliott (1920–1991), American professor of metallurgy
- J. H. Elliott (John Huxtable Elliott, 1930–2022), British historian
- John H. Elliott (biblical scholar) (1935–2020), New Testament scholar
- John Elliott (architect) (1936–2010), English architect
- John Elliott (businessman) (1941–2021), Australian businessman and prominent Liberal
- John Elliott, founder of Ebac, a British manufacturing company

== See also ==
- John Eliot (disambiguation)
- John Elliot (disambiguation)
- Jon Elliott (born 1947), radio presenter
- Jack Elliott (disambiguation)
