= Mireille Toledano =

British epidemiologist

Mireille Beracha Toledano
- Education: University College London; London School of Hygiene & Tropical Medicine
- Scientific career
- Workplaces: Imperial College London
- Thesis: Chlorination by-products and adverse birth outcomes : a retrospective semi-ecological study in three regions in England (2004)

Mireille Beracha Toledano is a British epidemiologist who is a professor and the Mohn Chair of Population Child Health at Imperial College London. She is Director of the Mohn Centre for Children's Health and Wellbeing. Her research considers the impact of air, noise and environmental pollution on mental and physical health.

== Early life and education ==
Toledano was an undergraduate at University College London and the London School of Hygiene & Tropical Medicine. She completed her doctoral research at Imperial College London, where she studied the impact of chlorination on birth outcomes in England.

== Research and career ==
Toledano is an epidemiologist who is an expert in environmental exposure. She is interested in how environmental exposure and sources of pollution impact public health. She has studied the impact of air and noise pollution, waste incineration and water disinfection by-products on birth outcomes.

Toledano established the Breast Milk, Environment, and Early-life Development (BEED), Study of Cognition, Adolescents and Mobile Phones (SCAMP) and COhort Study on MobileS (COSMOS) studies. BEED analysed human breast milk of people living around municipal waste incinerators, and explored childhood prevalence of atopic dermatitis, rhinitis and ADHD. She showed that proximity to multiple waste incinerators makes a small contribution to polychlorinated dibenzodioxins and polychlorinated biphenyls in breast milk. SCAMP studied how mobile phones and smart devices that emit electromagnetic radiation is associated with cognitive, behavioural, physical or mental health outcomes. SCAMP included cognitive assessments, questionnaires, demographic information and details on their environments. She found that women students, Black and minority ethnic students and students from non fee paying schools self-reported more mobile phone use. She showed that living near woodlands was associated with improved cognitive developments and reduced risk of emotional problems.

== Selected publications ==
- Asmaa-Ibrahim Gomaa; Shahid-A Khan; Mireille-B Toledano; Imam Waked; Simon-D Taylor-Robinson (21 July 2008). "Hepatocellular carcinoma: Epidemiology, risk factors and pathogenesis". World Journal of Gastroenterology. 14 (27): 4300–8. doi:10.3748/wjg.14.4300. ISSN 1007-9327. PMC 2731180. PMID 18666317. Wikidata Q27489394.
- Mark J Nieuwenhuijsen; Mireille B Toledano; Naomi E Eaton; John Fawell; Paul Elliott (1 February 2000). "Chlorination disinfection byproducts in water and their association with adverse reproductive outcomes: a review". Occupational and Environmental Medicine. 57 (2): 73–85. doi:10.1136/oem.57.2.73. ISSN 1351-0711. PMC 1739910. PMID 10711274. Wikidata Q33859331.
- Shahid A Khan; Simon D Taylor-Robinson; Mireille B Toledano; Angus Beck; Paul Elliott; Howard C Thomas (1 December 2002). "Changing international trends in mortality rates for liver, biliary and pancreatic tumours". Journal of Hepatology. 37 (6): 806–813. doi:10.1016/s0168-8278(02)00297-0. ISSN 0168-8278. PMID 12445422. Wikidata Q33962674.
