= Jane Elliott (disambiguation) =

Jane Elliott or Elliot may refer to:

- Jane Elliott (character) a.k.a. Jane Eyre, a fictional character in a 1847 novel by Charlotte Brontë
- Jane Elliott (sociologist) (born 1966), professor of social research
- Jane Elliott (born 1933), American educator
- Jane Elliot (born 1947), American actress
- Jane Elliott (choreographer) (born 1967), American dancer and choreographer
- Jean Elliot (1727–1805) Scottish poet, also known as Jane Elliot
- Jane Evans Elliot (1820–1886), American Civil War memoirist

== See also ==
- Elliot
- Patricia Leitch (1933–2015), British children's author who also used the pseudonym Jane Eliot
