= Francis Elliott =

Francis Elliott may refer to:

- Francis Elliott (archdeacon), Archdeacon of Berbice from 1908 to 1911
- Francis Elliott (journalist), British journalist
- Francis Perry Elliott (1861–1924), American writer and educator

== See also ==
- Francis Elliott Drouet (1907–1982), American phycologist
- Francis Elliot (1851–1940), British diplomat
- Francis Eliot (disambiguation)
