= List of Northeastern State RiverHawks in the NFL draft =

The Northeastern State RiverHawks football team, representing Northeastern State University, has had ten players selected in the National Football League (NFL) since the league began holding drafts in 1936). This includes one player selected in the third round. The Atlanta Falcons have the most NSU players, as they have drafted three RiverHawks.

Each NFL franchise seeks to add new players through the annual NFL Draft. The draft rules were last updated in 2009. The team with the worst record from the previous year picks first, the next-worst team second, and so on. Teams that did not make the playoffs are ordered by their regular-season record with any remaining ties broken by strength of schedule. Playoff participants are sequenced after non-playoff teams, based on their round of elimination (wild card, division, conference, and Super Bowl).

== Key ==
B	Back	K	Kicker	NT	Nose tackle
C	Center	LB	Linebacker	FB	Fullback
DB	Defensive back	P	Punter	HB	Halfback
DE	Defensive end	QB	Quarterback	WR	Wide receiver
DT	Defensive tackle	RB	Running back	G	Guard
E	End	T	Offensive tackle	TE	Tight end

== Selections ==
Year	Round	Pick	Player	Team	Position
1947	18	162	Barney Barnett	Chicago Cardinals	E
1955	14	163	George Elliott	Los Angeles Rams	B
1959	15	172	Fred Hood	Washington Redskins	E
1965	20	274	Billy Scott	Los Angeles Rams	E
1967	12	313	Kent Lashley	Kansas City Chiefs	WR
1972	2	42	Rosie Manning	Atlanta Falcons	DT
1972	6	147	Bob Hudson	Green Bay Packers	RB
1972	10	245	Mel Caraway	New England Patriots	DB
1973	8	208	Archie Pearman	Miami Dolphins	DE
1973	13	313	Willie Martin	Houston Oilers	T
1974	9	209	Ed McCartney	New England Patriots	LB
1978	12	309	Richard Crump	Buffalo Bills	RB
1979	8	212	Keith Miller	Atlanta Falcons	LB
1983	12	324	John Higginbotham	Tampa Bay Buccaneers	DT
1992	8	216	Derrick Moore	Atlanta Falcons	RB
2013	7	242	Michael Bowie	Seattle Seahawks	T
