= George Bradbury (judge) =

English judge and Protestant

George Bradbury (died 1696) was a senior English judge and Protestant. He thrived under the absolutist monarchy, but was punished during the Glorious Revolution for past association with the notorious Judge Jeffreys.

== Youth and education ==
Bradbury was the eldest son of Henry Bradbury of St. Martin's Fields, Middlesex. He was admitted a member of the Middle Temple on 28 June 1660 and received his master of arts from the University of Oxford on 28 September 1663. On 17 May 1667 he was called to the bar and in 1689 he became Curistor Baron of Exchequer.

== Career ==
Bradbury's first notable court appearance was on 3 June 1684 as junior counsel against Theodosia Ivie, also known as Lady Ivy, in a suit in which she asserted her title to lands in Shadwell. The projector, Thomas Neale, stated alongside Bradbury during trial that the deeds she owned were false, and later won the suit. Bradbury won commendation from Chief Justice Jeffreys who was trying the case, for pointing out that the date which the deeds bore described Philip and Mary, in whose reign they purported to have been executed, by a title which they did not assume till some years later.

In 1861, Bradbury was listed as one of two trustees of the marriage settlement of one of the Carys of Tor Abbey.

In December 1688, chiefs of the bar, including Bradbury, were summoned to consult with the peers about the Glorious Revolution. In the July of 1689 he was assigned by the House of Lords as counsel to defend Sir Adam Blair, Robert Gray and Dr. John Elliott, among others, who were impeached for high treason against the King James II. The impeachment was later abandoned.

On 9 July, upon the death of Baron William Carr, he was appointed to the bench of the court of exchequer. Bradbury held this position until his death on 12 February 1696.

His final recorded judicial act is a letter preserved in the treasury in support of a petition of the Earl of Scarborough on 19 April 1695.
