= Robert Elyot =

Robert Elyot may refer to:

- Robert Elyot (bishop)
- Robert Elyot (MP)

== See also ==
- Robert Elliott (disambiguation)
