= Jack Elliott =

Jack Elliott may refer to:

- Jack Elliott (rugby union) (1871–1938), Welsh rugby union player
- John Elliot (songwriter) (1914–1972), American songwriter, also known as Jack Elliott
- Jack Elliott (racing journalist) (1922–2007), Australian horse racing journalist
- Jack Elliott (composer) (1927–2001), American television and film composer
- Ramblin' Jack Elliott (born 1931), American folk performer
- Jack Elliott (footballer) (born 1995), English footballer
- Jack Elliott (broadcaster), American radio personality
- Jack Elliott (album), a 1964 album by Ramblin' Jack Elliott

== See also ==
- John Elliot (disambiguation)
- John Elliott (disambiguation)
