= Francis Eliot =

Francis Eliot may refer to:

- Francis Perceval Eliot (1755–1818), English soldier, auditor, and man of letters
- Francis Breynton Eliot (1781–1855), military officer

== See also ==
- Francis Elliot (1851–1940), British diplomat
- Francis Elliott (disambiguation)
- Frances Reed Elliot (1892–1965), American nurse
