= Alan Elliott (disambiguation) =

Alan Elliott (1925–2006) was an Australian rules footballer.

Alan Elliott may also refer to:

- Allan Elliott McDonald (1903–1957), Australian politician
- Alan Elliott, film producer of Amazing Grace
