= Robert Elliott =

Robert, Rob, Robbie, Bob or Bobby Elliott may refer to:

== Clergymen ==
- Robert Elliott (chaplain) (before 1755–after 1809), Scots-Irish Presbyterian clergyman in the United States
- Robert W. B. Elliott (1840–1887), bishop of West Texas in the Episcopal Church

== Entertainers ==
- Robert Elliott (actor, born 1879) (1879–1951), American character actor
- Bob Elliott (comedian) (1923–2016), American comic performer
- Bobby Elliott (born 1941), English rock drummer with The Hollies
- Robert Elliott (actor, born 1944) (1944–2004), American character actor
- R. Bruce Elliott (Robert Bruce Elliott, born 1949), American actor and voice actor
- Rob Elliott (born 1965), Australian television presenter

== Public officials ==
- Robert B. Elliott (1842–1884), African-American member of congress from South Carolina
- Robert G. Elliott (1874–1939), American executioner based in New York
- Robert Elliott (Victorian politician) (1886–1950), Australian senator
- Robert Ellsworth Elliott (1901–after 1959), Canadian politician
- J. Robert Elliott (1910–2006), U.S. federal judge; Georgia state representative
- Robert William Elliott, Baron Elliott of Morpeth (1920–2011), British Conservative party politician, MP 1957–1983
- Bob Elliott (politician) (1927–2013), member of the Legislative Assembly of Alberta, 1982–1993
- Robert Elliott (New Hampshire politician), American politician

== Sportspeople ==
- Bob Elliott (baseball) (1916–1966), American third baseman and right fielder in Major League Baseball
- Bob Elliott (sportswriter) (born 1949), Canadian sports columnist
- Robert Elliott (fencer) (born 1950), Hong Kong Olympic fencer
- Robert Elliott (Australian rules footballer) (born 1953), Australian rules footballer
- Bob Elliott (basketball) (born 1955), American basketball player and television sportscaster
- Robbie Elliott (born 1973), English footballer
- Rob Elliot, English footballer manager (born 1986)

== Others ==
- Robert Elliott (songwriter) (before 1840–after 1880), English poet from Northumberland
- Robert J. Elliott (born 1940), Canadian mathematician
- Bob Elliott (medical researcher) (1934–2020), New Zealand medical researcher
- Robert Elliott (priest) (1658–1735), Irish Anglican priest

== See also ==
- Robert Elliot (disambiguation)
- Robert Elliott's Wholesale Grocery, a historic commercial building in Hannibal, Marion County, Missouri
