= Bruce Elliott =

Bruce Elliott may refer to:

- Bruce Elliott (writer) (1914–1973), American writer
- Bruce Elliott (footballer) (born 1956), Australian rules footballer
- Bruce Elliott (bridge), Canadian bridge player
- R. Bruce Elliott (born 1949), American actor and voice actor
- Bruce Elliott, painter and owner of Old Town Ale House, Chicago

== See also ==
- Bruce Elliott-Smith, British songwriter and producer
