= George Eliot (disambiguation) =

George Eliot was the pen name of English novelist Mary Ann Evans (1819–1880)

George Eliot may also refer to:

- George Eliot (spy) (before 1555—after 1581), English confidence man, also known as George Elliott, who arrested Edmund Campion
- George Augustus Eliot (1784–1835), English and Canadian Army officer, son of Francis Perceval Eliot
- George Fielding Eliot (1894–1971), Australian military analyst and author

== See also ==
- George Eliot Hospital NHS Trust, English institution in Nuneaton, Warwickshire
- George Eliot Hospital, English medical building in Nuneaton, Warwickshire
- George Eliot Academy, English secondary school in Nuneaton, Warwickshire
- George Elliot (disambiguation)
- George Elliott (disambiguation)
