= Mary Ann Elliott =

American businessperson (born 1943)

- Born: Mary Ann Edwards; 1943 (age 82–83); Newport News, Virginia, U.S.
- Occupations: Business executive, entrepreneur
- Employer(s): Motorola; Arrowhead Global Services
- Board member of: Coast Guard Foundation; UNC Pembroke
- Children: 3
- Awards: See list

Mary Ann Elliott (born 1943) is an American business executive, entrepreneur, and philanthropist. She is the founder and CEO of Arrowhead Global Services Inc., a company that provided domestic and international satellite communications capacity to U.S. military and other government agencies, and is one of the first women to work in the wireless communications industry.

== Early life ==
Mary Ann Edwards was born in 1943 in Newport News, Virginia. As a child, her family moved to Robeson County, North Carolina and lived on a farm. Her family was of Tuscarora and Lumbee heritage.

She faced numerous personal and professional challenges early in life. Married at 14, a mother by 15, and a high school drop-out, she was widowed in 1975 when her husband died in a car accident.

After her husband's death, she earned her G.E.D. and initially worked as an encyclopedia salesperson. Seeking more stable employment, she applied for a position at Motorola, which had just begun hiring women in the field of terrestrial wireless communications. After being rejected three times, Elliott directly appealed to the chairman of the board and was eventually hired, becoming the first woman to work in Motorola's terrestrial wireless communications division.

== Career ==
Elliott built a career in the commercial satellite communications industry, gaining extensive experience through multiple corporate mergers. Over an eight-year span, she navigated five mergers but found that, without a formal degree, she frequently had to restart her career trajectory. Recognizing a pattern in corporate acquisitions and restructuring, she decided to take a buyout package during the merger of Contel Corporation and GTE Corp., using the financial cushion to launch her own company.

In 1991, Elliott founded Arrowhead Global Services Inc., a woman-owned, Native American business participating in the Small Business Administration's 8(a) business development program. Initially operating from her basement, she later subleased office space from another woman-owned business to minimize costs during the company's early years. Arrowhead Global Services specialized in providing commercial satellite communications services to government agencies, capitalizing on the military's increasing reliance on commercial satellite technology during and after Operation Desert Storm. One of the company's primary clients was the Defense Information Systems Agency, and it was selected by the government to design and implement the Defense Cyber-Warning Information Network.

Under Elliott’s leadership, Arrowhead Global Services became a leading provider of satellite communications services, securing major government contracts and recognized among Washington Technology’s Top 25 8(a) businesses. The company reached $100 million in annual revenues prior to being sold in 2007.

Outside of her business activities, Elliott has served as a delegate to the National Ocean Industry Association's Telecommunication Policy Committee and Radio Technical Committee, a board member of the Coast Guard Foundation, and a trustee of the University of North Carolina at Pembroke. Elliott has also been a keynote speaker to various trade associations and organizations, including the National Association of Women Business Owners.

== Philanthropy ==
Elliott established higher education scholarships at the UNC Pembroke, and founded the Morningstar Foundation to support causes supporting women and children.

In 2017, Elliott donated $500,000 to the UNC Pembroke School of Business, and a career center in the facility is named the Mary Ann Elliott Business Career Center in her honor. In 2021, Elliot made a $6 million donation to UNC Pembroke, the second largest donation in the institution's history, to establish the McKenzie-Elliott School of Nursing.

== Awards and honors ==
Elliott is the recipient of various awards and honors. Elliott was the recipient of the Women in Aerospace Lifetime Achievement Award in 1997. In 2003, Elliott was honored as a Virginia Women in History inductee. In 2007, she became the second women inducted into the Society of Satellite Professionals International Hall of Fame.

In 2009, Elliott was awarded an honorary Doctor of Humane Letters from UNC Pembroke.
