= George Elliot =

George Elliot may refer to:

- George Elliot (Royal Navy officer, born 1784) (1784–1863), British naval officer and Member of Parliament for Roxburghshire 1832–1835
- George Elliot (Royal Navy officer, born 1813) (1813–1901), British naval officer and Member of Parliament for Chatham 1874–1875
- Sir George Elliot, 1st Baronet (1814–1893), British businessman and Conservative Member of Parliament 1868–1880, 1886–1892
- Sir George Elliot, 2nd Baronet (1844–1895), British businessman and Member of Parliament 1874–1885, 1886–1895
- George Elliot, Australian actor who wrote, produced and starred in 2004's The Crop
- George Elliot (rugby league) (born 1991), English centre and wing

== See also ==
- George Francis Scott Elliot, botanist and academic author
- George Eliot (disambiguation)
- George Elliott (disambiguation)
