= Trevor Elliott =

Australian rules footballer (1937–2019)

Personal information
- Full name: Trevor Henry Elliott
- Born: 31 December 1937
- Died: 15 June 2019 (aged 81)
- Original team: Seymour
- Height: 191 cm (6 ft 3 in)
- Weight: 88 kg (194 lb)

Playing career^{1}
Years	Club	Games (Goals)
1957–58	Essendon	7 (1)
1960–61	Footscray	23 (9)
Total		30 (10)
- ^{1} Playing statistics correct to the end of 1961.

Trevor Henry Elliott (31 December 1937 – 15 June 2019) was an Australian rules footballer who played with Essendon and Footscray in the Victorian Football League (VFL).

His brother, Morrie also played league football for South Melbourne.
