= Michael Elliott =

Michael Elliott may refer to:

- Michael Elliott (chemist) (1924–2007), British chemist
- Michael Elliott (director) (1931–1984), English director
- Michael Elliott (politician) (born 1932), British politician, MEP in European Parliament election, 1999 (United Kingdom)
- Michael Elliott (film critic), American film critic
- Michael A. Elliott, American literary scholar, president of Amherst College
- Michael J. Elliott (1951–2016), journalist and CEO of the anti-poverty advocacy organization ONE

== See also ==
- Mike Elliott (disambiguation)
