= Donald H. Elliott =

American lawyer (1932–2021)

Donald Harrison Elliott
- Donald H. Elliott, 1969
- Born: August 20, 1932; Manhattan, New York, US
- Died: December 23, 2021 (aged 89); Brooklyn, New York, US
- Occupation: Director of the New York City Planning Commission
- Years active: 1966–1973 (as planning director)
- Spouse: Barbara Ann Burton (m. 1956; died 1998)
- Children: 3

Donald Harrison Elliott (August 20, 1932 – December 23, 2021) was an American urban planner. He was chairman of the New York City Planning Commission from the late 1960s to the early 1970s. He helped lead the city away from the large-scale disruptive projects of Robert Moses to more neighborhood-friendly and historically respectful development.

== Early life and education ==
Donald Harrison Elliott was born in Manhattan on August 20, 1932, to Harrison Sackett Elliott, a professor at Union Theological Seminary, and Grace Elliott, the national president of the YWCA. He attended the New Lincoln School and then Carleton College where he received his degree in 1954. In 1957, he earned a law degree from New York University.

== Career ==
=== Early career ===
Elliott was a Reform Democrat. Following graduation in the early 1960s, he was an urban renewal administrator on the Upper West Side. He then worked as a lawyer specializing in land-use regulation at Webster & Sheffield where he met John Lindsay and worked on his 1965 mayoral campaign. In Lindsay's administration, Elliott oversaw the transition of Mayor Robert F. Wagner's administration, and antipoverty and housing programs until November 1966 when he was named director (aka president) of the City Planning Department at age 34.

=== New York City Planning Commission ===
As director of the City Planning Department, Elliott worked to complete the city's master plan that capitalized on the city's strengths to qualify for federal funding for public housing and under mandate by the 1938 City Charter. The Lindsay administration was supportive of Elliott's work, and he was able to institute innovative programs that encouraged the government's social responsibility.

According to Judge Marrero, Elliott "infused great youthful energy ... into the reform of the town planning department. To do this, he recruited an impressive cadre of young planners and architects outside of the civil service, which meant making some bureaucratic interests very unhappy". Elliott created the Urban Design Group in 1967 with architects Jaquelin T. Robertson, Richard Weinstein, Myles Weintraub and Jonathan Barnett. The group enhanced the aesthetics of the city, moving away from Moses' large scale disruptive projects and developed neighborhood-specific zoning plans. He also encouraged the sale of air rights, progressive standards for projects, and neighborhood preservation. Elliott also worked with the administration to create “community planning boards,” now known as community boards, to encourage community engagement. All these efforts worked together to change the city's skyline and incorporated more opportunities to combat poverty in the city. According to Paul Goldberger, "Donald Elliott was a realist who believed in the need to make the city more livable, and he used inventive legal tactics in trying to balance the forces at play in New York. New York's whole approach to planning has changed, and he has played a key role in almost every innovation".

Elliott served as director until 1973 when John Zuccotti was named to the position, and he returned to Webster & Sheffield.

=== Later career ===
After New York's fiscal crisis in the mid-1970s, the private sector began to take a larger role in planning and design, causing many of Elliott's social efforts in planning to fall by the wayside in favor of business and luxury. In 1975, Elliott became chairman of the New York Urban Coalition following Herbert B. Woodman's retirement.

Following his civil service work Elliott resumed his legal career by becoming Counsel for law firm Bryant Rabbino. He "represented clients before the NYC Planning Commission, the NYC Landmarks Preservation Commission, and the NYC Board of Standards and Appeals. He [was] also the attorney and advisor on a number of large-scale projects around the country, including projects in New Orleans, Pittsburgh and Santa Fe". In 1987, Elliott became a founding trustee on the board of The Isamu Noguchi Foundation and Garden Museum in New York, acting as Counsel and advisor.

== Personal life ==
Elliott wed Barbara Ann Burton (d. 1998) in 1956, and they had three sons.

Elliott died aged 89 years in Brooklyn on 23 December 2021.

== Publications ==
- Donald H., Elliott; Marcus, Norman (1973). "From Euclid to Ramapo: New Directions in Land Development Controls". Hofstra Law Review. 1 (1, article 6). Hofstra University.
- Elliott, Donald H. (April 1981). "Development Rights". Pace Law Review. 1 (3, article 21): 693–757.
