= Ray Elliot =

Ray or Raymond Elliot may refer to:

- Ray Elliot of Them (band)
- Ray Elliot, character in The Alibi
- Raymond Elliot, coach

== See also ==
- Ray Eliot
- Raymond Elliott (disambiguation)
