= Robert Elliot =

Robert Elliot may refer to:

- Rob Elliot (born 1986), English-born Irish footballer
- Robert Henry Elliot (1837–1914), Scottish writer
- Robert Elliot (Royal Navy officer) (1790–1849), English naval officer and topographical draughtsman
- Robert Elliot (surgeon) (1864–1936), British ophthalmic surgeon and author

== See also ==
- Robert Elliott (disambiguation)
