= John Eliot =

John Eliot may refer to:

- John Eliot (1562–1594?), author and translator of the Ortho-epia Gallica
- John Eliot (statesman) (1592–1632), English politician
- John Eliot (missionary) (c. 1604–1690), English Puritan minister and missionary
- John Eliot (died 1685) (1612–1685), English politician
- Sir John Eliot, 1st Baronet (1736–1786), Scottish physician
- John Eliot (Royal Navy officer) (1742–1769), British naval officer and governor of West Florida
- John Eliot, 1st Earl of St Germans (1761–1823), British politician
- John Eliot, 6th Earl of St Germans (1890–1922), British nobleman and army officer
- John Eliot (meteorologist) (1839–1908), English mathematician and meteorologist

== See also ==
- John Elliot (disambiguation)
- John Elliott (disambiguation)
- John Eliot Historic District, Natick, Massachusetts, named in honor of the missionary
- John Eliot Square District, Boston, Massachusetts, named in honor of the missionary
