= The Haunted Pajamas =

1917 film by Fred J. Balshofer

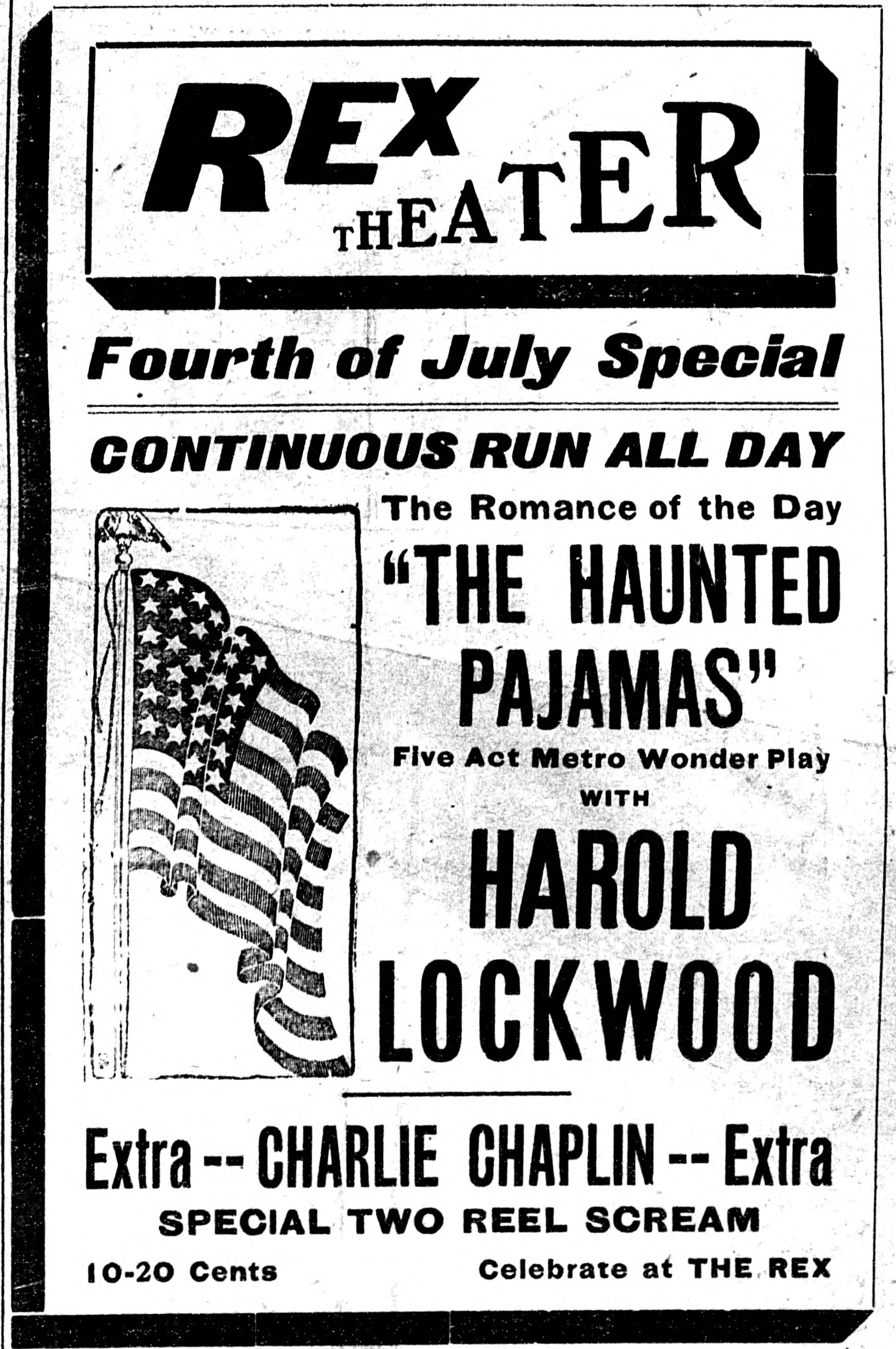
- Contemporary advertisement
- Directed by: Fred J. Balshofer; Charles P. Stallings
- Based on: The Haunted Pajamas by Francis Perry Elliott
- Starring: Harold Lockwood; Carmel Myers; Edward Sedgwick
- Cinematography: Tony Gaudio
- Production company: Yorke Film Corporation
- Distributed by: Metro Pictures Corporation
- Release date: June 11, 1917
- Running time: 5 reels
- Country: United States
- Language: Silent (English intertitles)

The Haunted Pajamas is a 1917 comedy-drama film directed by Fred J. Balshofer. The film is based on the novel of the same name by Francis Perry Elliott. A copy of the film survives.

== Plot ==
Richard Hudson receives a pair of silk pajamas from a friend that can transform a person into another person. When he puts the pajamas on, he turns into a fighter, but returns to normal the next day. Throughout the film, two more characters put on the pajamas, and they are mistaken for two other characters in the film. The film ends with the characters burning the pajamas.

== Cast ==
- Harold Lockwood as Richard Hudson
- Carmel Myers as Frances Kirkland
- Edward Sedgwick as Jack Billings
- Lester Cuneo as Judge Billings
- Paul Willis as Francis Billings
- Harry de Roy as Jenkins
- Helen Ware as Elizabeth Billings
- William De Vaull as Colonel Kirkland
