= Jonathan Elliot =

Jonathan Elliot may refer to:

- Jonathan Elliot (publisher) (1784–1846), American publisher
- Jonathan Elliot, Superman character; see Superman: Whatever Happened to the Man of Tomorrow?
- Jon Elliott (born 1947), American radio presenter
- Jonathan Elliott, American composer and teacher

== See also ==
- John Elliot (disambiguation)
