= Alice Gordon Elliott =

Nurse and community worker (1886–1977)

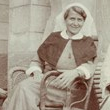
- Born: Alice Gordon King; August 21, 1886; Hobart
- Died: August 29, 1977 (aged 91); Lindisfarne, Tasmania
- Occupation: nurse
- Spouse: Charles Hazell Elliott

Alice Gordon King became Alice Gordon Elliott OBE (August 21, 1886 – August 29, 1977) was an Australian nurse and community worker. She became a magistrate and led a Voluntary Aid Detachment during WWII.

== Life ==
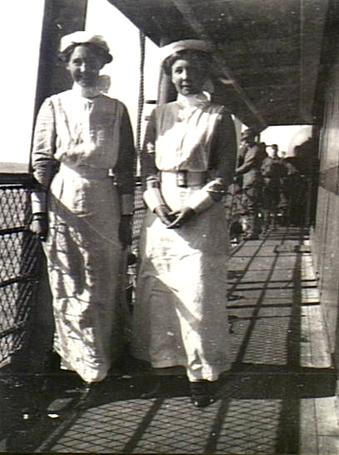
Sisters Alice Gordon King and Janet Radcliffe in 1914 on board the Geelong

Elliott was born in Hobart in Tasmania. By 1911 she was a qualified nurse and when the war started the first two nurses posted abroad, as part of the Australian Army Nursing Service, were her and Sister Janet Radcliffe. They travelled with the 12th Battalion on SS Geelong and arrived in Egypt at the end of 1914. Elliot was a nurse in a hotel, transformed into a hospital, in Alexandria.

In 1915 she was in a hospital receiving the wounded from the Ottoman attempted Raid on the Suez Canal. The notes she made at the time recorded that the wounded there served as an introduction to the "distressful days of Gallipoli" where she and Sister Radcliffe worked on hospital ships. They were both mentioned in dispatches.

In 1915 and 1916 she was romantically involved with Charles Hazell Elliott. He had already been to England to recover from being shot and he was then back in Gallipoli in charge of the 12th Australian Infantry Battalion. A November 1915 postcard from Alice sent from Marseilles advised him that if he got shot again then he should label himself to go to the 10th Australian General Hospital in England as that was where she was heading.

She had to resign following her marriage to Lieutenant Colonel Charles Hazell Elliott in December 1917 at St Marylebone Parish Church in London. She joined the Field Naturalists' Club in 1918 and in 1919 she and her husband returned to Tasmania.

At the end of the war 89 Tasmanian sisters returned from the conflicts and in 1919/20 the Returned Sisters' Association was formed and Elliott was the founding President. The organisation intended to "wake up" the nursing establishment and ensure that veteran nurses found employment. They set up a nurses' club and a place where nurses and employers could find each other.

Elliott was the commandant of Voluntary Aid Detachment 605 during World War Two and she gave lectures on first aid and gases used in warfare. Her husband died in 1956 and in the same year she was awarded an OBE.

Elliott died in the Hobart suburb of Lindisfarne in 1977.
