= Gideon Elliott =

Australian cricketer

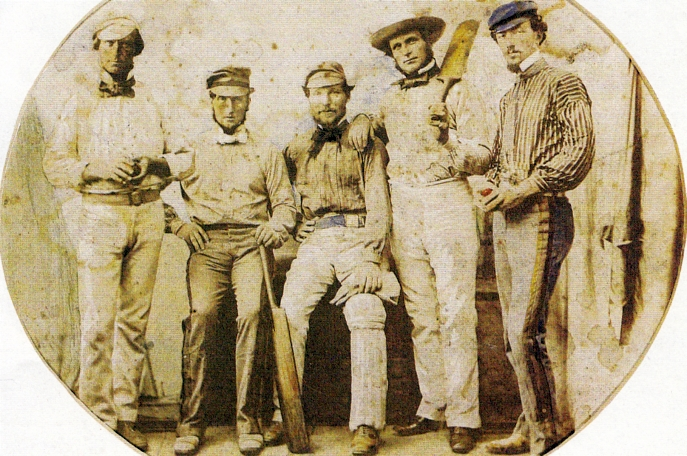
- Gideon Elliott (far left)

Personal information
- Born: 17 April 1828; Merstham, Surrey, England
- Died: 15 February 1869 (aged 40); Richmond, Melbourne, Australia

Domestic team information
- Years: Team
- 1856-1862: Victoria
- Source: Cricinfo, 13 February 2015

Gideon Elliott (17 April 1828 – 15 February 1869) was an Australian cricketer. He played nine first-class cricket matches for Victoria. In February 1858, in a match against Tasmania, he took nine wickets in the first innings. He bowled 19 overs, including 17 maidens, conceding just two runs.

== See also ==
- List of Victoria first-class cricketers
