= Warren Grice Elliott =

American railroad executive (1848–1906)

Warren Grice Elliott (March 22, 1848 – September 17, 1906) was president of the Atlantic Coast Line Railroad starting in 1902.

== Biography ==
He was born on March 22, 1848, and attended the University of North Carolina at Chapel Hill Class of 1867, where he was a member of the Chi Phi fraternity. He married Margaret Blow on December 5, 1871, and they had as their son, Milton Courtright Elliott in 1879. Warren became president of the Atlantic Coast Line Railroad starting in 1902 when Henry Walters retired. He died on September 17, 1906, in Watkins Glen, New York.
