= John Bardoe Elliott =

Civil servant

John Bardoe Elliott (1785 – 26 August 1863) was a civil servant in Colonial India. He is best known for his collection of oriental manuscripts that he donated to the Bodleian Library at the University of Oxford in 1859.

== Early life ==
Elliott was born in 1785 in Ripon, Yorkshire, the son of John E. Elliott, a naval officer, and Isabella (Todd) Elliott.

== India ==
Elliott travelled to India in 1800 and spent more than 50 years there. He served as a judge in Patna in 1822-28 then later as the resident there, retiring in 1845. He died in Patna on 26 August 1863.

== Collections ==
Elliott acquired many of the manuscripts collected by Gore Ouseley. The Ouseley manuscripts were not kept separately by Elliott, so that provenance cannot be distinguished fully among the Oxford collections. The Elliott manuscripts are described in the catalogue published in 1889.

== Research ==
Elliott was active as a researcher and published an article on a Buddhist inscription.
