= Janet A. W. Elliott =

Canadian engineering scientist and thermodynamics researcher

Janet Anne Wade Elliott
- Born: 1967 (age 58–59)
- Citizenship: Canada
- Occupations: Engineering scientist, researcher, professor

Academic background
- Education: University of Toronto

Janet A. W. Elliott (born 1967) is a Canadian engineering scientist and researcher in thermodynamics. She is a distinguished professor in the University of Alberta Faculty of Engineering, and held a Tier 1 Canada Research Chair in thermodynamics (2011–2025). Elliott develops and applies thermodynamic models to study the physics of surfaces, such as liquid–vapor boundaries, and to advance cryopreservation, the process of preserving living cells and tissues through cooling and rewarming them without significant damage.

Janet Elliott is a fellow of the American Institute for Medical and Biological Engineering, Chemical Institute of Canada, Society for Cryobiology, and Canadian Academy of Engineering. In 2022, she was named a Fellow of the Royal Society of Canada.
