= Rod Elliott =

Australian rules footballer

Personal information
- Full name: Rod Elliott
- Born: 16 June 1951 (age 75)
- Original team: West Coburg
- Height: 178 cm (5 ft 10 in)
- Weight: 73 kg (161 lb)

Playing career^{1}
Years	Club	Games (Goals)
1969–71	North Melbourne	15 (9)
- ^{1} Playing statistics correct to the end of 1971.

Rod Elliott (born 16 June 1951) is a former Australian rules footballer who played with North Melbourne in the Victorian Football League (VFL).
