= Mike Elliott =

Mike Elliott may refer to:

== Music ==
- Mike Elliott (guitarist) (1940–2005), American jazz guitarist
- Mike Elliott (saxophonist) (born 1929), Jamaican saxophonist, formerly of Rico's Combo & The Cabin Boys
- Mike Elliott (disc jockey), American DJ and musician

== Other ==
- Mike Elliott (rugby) (born c. 1945), Welsh rugby league footballer of the 1960s and 1970s for Oldham
- Mike Elliott (comedian) (1946–2014), British actor, comedian, television and radio host
- Mike Elliott (Australian politician) (born 1952), politician leader of the Australian Democrats
- Mike Elliott (American politician), member of the Alabama House of Representatives
- Mike Elliott (filmmaker), American film producer and director
- Mike Elliott (game designer), American designer of games such as Magic: The Gathering
- Mike Elliott (radio personality), voice over artist and radio personality
- Mike Elliott (skier) (1942–2024), American Olympic skier
- Mike Elliott (Formula One) (born 1974), British Formula One aerodynamicist

== See also ==
- Michael Elliott (disambiguation)
