= Zena Elliott =

New Zealand artist

Dr Zena Elliott
- Born: 1975 (age 50–51); Whakatāne
- Education: Te Wānanga o Aotearoa (BMA (Whakairo)); Waikato Institute of Technology (MVA), Auckland University of Technology (PhD)
- Style: multidisciplinary

Zena Elliott (born 1975) is a New Zealand multidisciplinary artist. Their works are held in the collection of Auckland Art Gallery and Waikato Museum.

== Biography ==
Elliott was born in Whakatāne in 1975, and raised in Te Teko. They started their art practice in the 1990s. Elliott completed their Master of Visual Arts with Distinction at WINTEC in 2006, a Bachelor of Māori Art (Whakairo) at Te Wānanga o Aotearoa, and a PhD at AUT.

Elliott's paintings reflect references to their whakapapa with influences from abstract, stencil and street art. Inspirations include mid-20th-century abstract paintings of Bridget Riley and Frank Stella.

Elliott's work explores themes of gender fluidity, visibility, cultural identity and popular culture. Their work is vibrant and lively, and Elliott has been incorporating fluorescent, glow-in-the-dark and neon colours into their work since the mid-1990s.

Elliott's partner Tia Barrett is also an artist, and the two have exhibited works together.

Elliott is affiliated with Ngāti Awa, Te Whānau-ā-Apanui, Ngāti Rangitihi, Ngāi Te Rangi and Te Arawa.

== Exhibitions ==
Solo:

- Haukura/Neon Voice: Recent works by Zena Elliott, Waikato Museum, 2016
- Ripekanga/Intersections, Milford Galleries, 2017
- Whanonga Pono, Rotorua Arts Village, 2019

Group:

- Neoteric, Whitespace, 2004
- The Inimitable Mr. Hopkins, Waikato Museum, 2008
- Got it Sussed, Whakatane Museum and Gallery, 2008
- Tānikokiko, Māngere Arts Centre - Ngā Tohu o Uenuku, 2017
- Frankton, Skinroom Gallery, 2020
- Toi Tū Toi Ora, Auckland Art Gallery, 2020-21
- Āniwaniwa, Wormhole, 2022
- Zena Elliott & Tia Barrett: Muramura of Protest, Depot Artspace, 2023
