= Elicser Elliott =

Jabari "Elicser" Elliott
- Born: Montreal, Quebec, Canada
- Education: Sheridan College
- Known for: Muralist; Street Art; Aerosol Art; Graffiti
- Movement: Contemporary Art
- Website: Elicser.com

Jabari "Elicser" Elliott is a visual-artist based in Toronto, Ontario.

== Early life and education ==
While Elliott was born in Montreal, he spent his formative years living in Saint Vincent. Elliott helped his mother recreate costumes for the local carnival with which his father was heavily involved. Upon his family's return to Canada, Elliott was introduced to street art while studying at the Etobicoke School of the Arts. His high school's guidance counsellor directed him to Sheridan College's program in Animation and affirmed for the young artist the possibilities of a career in the arts.

Elliott studied animation at Sheridan College.

== Career ==
Since graduating from Sheridan College's animation program, Elliott has amassed a collection of murals and public artworks that have come to help define Toronto's cityscape. Moving beyond notions of the streets being his only canvas, Elliott has exhibited works at The Art Gallery of Ontario, The Royal Ontario Museum, and LE Gallery. Elliott has also acted as an arts educator working with the Art Gallery of Ontario's "Free After Three" youth arts program, and the Toronto Jazz Festival, teaching youth aerosol paint techniques.

Elliott's most notable works can be described as a highly improvised collage of soft characters and organic shapes, layered and blended through transparencies. His character work is often mediated by past experiences and relationships while also drawing on the likenesses of passers-by to complete his community-based murals. In 2012 Elliott also illustrated and produced a small run of books titled "Know Love". The book was born out of his own frustrations with love, and in the hopes that all who read the book would come to understand how simple love is.

In 2011, Elliott met with Toronto Mayor Rob Ford to advocate for the significance and vibrance of graffiti murals as public art. At the time, Councillor Cesar Palacio had advocated for more street art as part of combatting blighted urban communities.

Elicser has been voted by NOW magazine as the "Best Local Graffiti Artist" for 2014, 2013, 2012 + 2011. He is recognized as Canada's leading aerosol artist by Who's Who in Black Canada.
