= Harold Elliott (cricketer) =

English cricketer

Harold Elliott (15 June 1904 – 15 April 1969) was an English cricketer active from 1927 to 1936 who played for Lancashire. He was born and died in Wigan. He was essentially a Lancashire Second XI player but appeared in one first-class match in 1930 as a righthanded batsman and wicketkeeper. He scored four runs and held two catches with one stumping.
