= Peter Elliott (pharmacologist) =

British pharmacologist (born 1958)

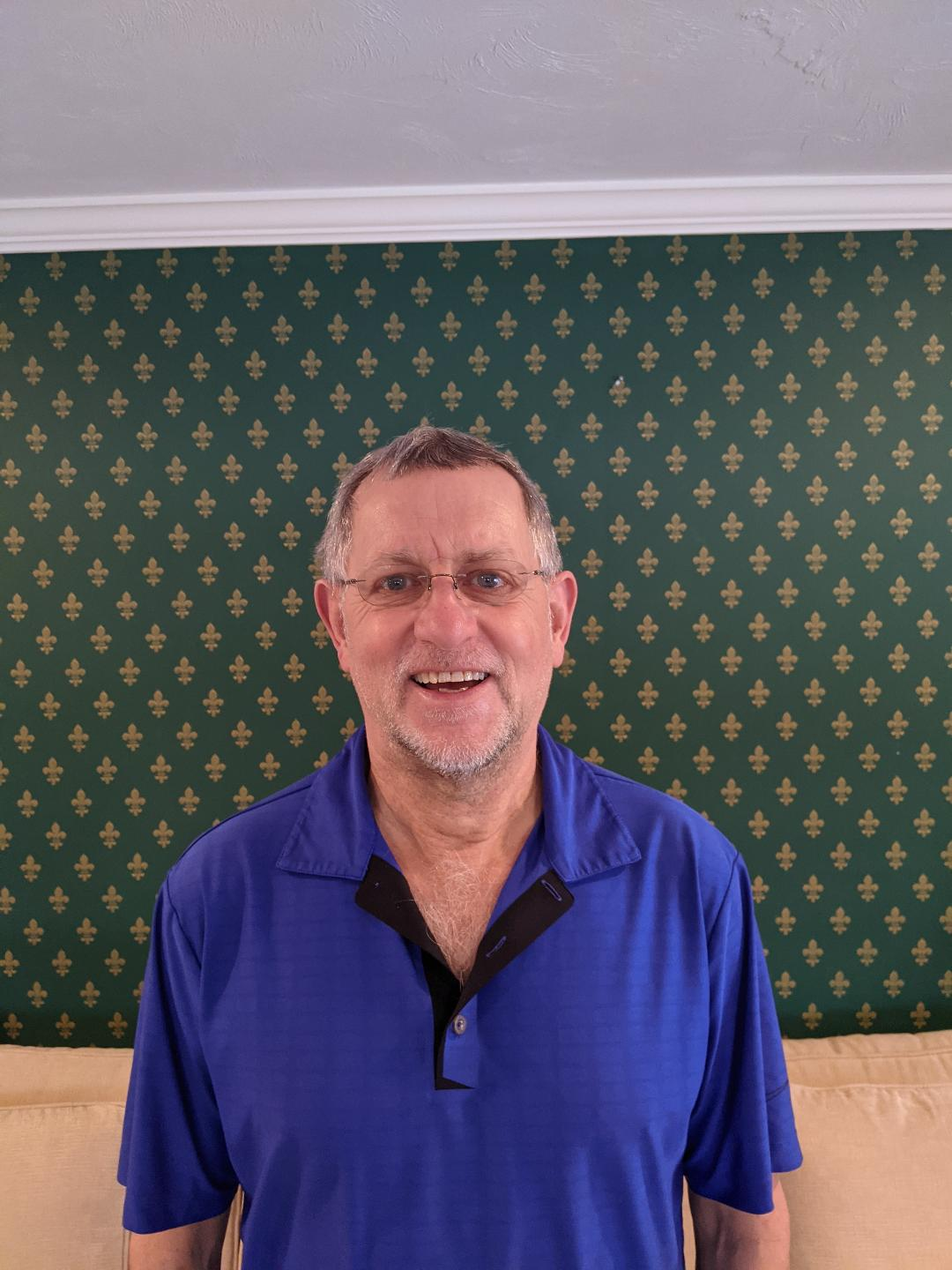
- Born: Peter John Elliott; August 19, 1958 (age 68); Cardiff, Wales
- Education: London University (Chelsea College); Cambridge University (Trinity College)
- Scientific career
- Fields: Pharmacology, Drug Development
- Workplaces: Wapiti Pharmaceutical Consulting

Peter Elliott (born August 19, 1958) is a British pharmacologist and drug developer who has initiated clinical trials across a range of disease areas, and is the co-developer of Velcade, a drug used to treat multiple myeloma.

== Early life and education ==
Elliott was born in Cardiff, Wales and attended Llanishen High school before being accepted to study pharmacology at Chelsea College, University of London (1979-1981). During this period he spent a year gaining research experience at The Medical Clinic, Tubingen, Germany, working with Peter A. Berg on the autoimmune disease, Primary biliary cholangitis (1978-1980). After graduating, Elliott embarked upon a Ph.D., under the supervision of Leslie and Susan Iversen at Cambridge University, where he was a member of Trinity College (1981-1984). His research focused on the behavioural effects of neurokinins on catecholamine systems and was carried out at the Department of Psychology, and the Medical Research Council's (MRC) Neurochemical Pharmacology Unit (NCPU), at Addenbrookes Hospital. During his Ph.D., Elliott published seven research papers, including in the scientific journals, Nature and Science. The Nature paper was one of the first publications to utilize monoclonal antibodies as pharmaceutical tools. The monoclonal antibody to Substance P, used in the paper, was generated from an adjacent laboratory of César Milstein.

== Academic career ==
In 1984, Elliott was granted a research Fellowship to work with Charles B. Nemeroff at the Department of Psychiatry, Duke University. There he investigated the role of neurotensin on dopamine systems in the central nervous system, in relation to psychiatric disorders such as schizophrenia. The following year he moved to Yale University & The Connecticut Mental Health Center to work with Michael J. Bannon (1985-1986) to investigate the effects of neurokinins on molecular aspects of dopamine systems, and their potential role in psychiatry, and in particular, their ability to modulate the tardive dyskinesias elicited by certain neuroleptics. Subsequently, Elliott took a post-doctoral position in the Pharmacology Department, McGill University (1986-1988) where he focused on animal models of Alzheimer's disease, as well as developing new monoclonal antibodies for research purposes. During his tenure at McGill, Elliott was also invited to spend time, as a visiting scholar, with Erminio Costa at the FIDIA-Georgetown University Institute for Neuroscience, where he explored the ability of nerve growth factor to modulate/repair degenerative diseases of the central nervous system.

Elliott then moved into the pharmaceutical-biotechnology arena where he worked on developing drugs to treat conditions including inflammation, diabetes, pain and cancer. Elliott has over 300 publications in journals including Nature, Science, Cell, P.N.A.S., J. Medicinal Chemistry, Brain Research, Neuroscience, Blood, Cancer Research, and J. Clinical Oncology.

== Pharmaceutical and biotechnology career ==
During the second year at McGill, Elliott was recruited to Glaxo Group Research, in the UK (now GlaxoSmithKline) to head up their Parkinson's and Movement Disorder group. During this time (1988-1993), he also worked on preclinical aspects of the drug, Ondansetron (a novel and first in class antiemetic drug), as well as exploring novel non-opioid opportunities to develop drugs to treat pain. Elliott co-authored the Glaxo Pocket Guide to Pharmacology during this period. In 1993, Elliott was hired by the biotechnology company, Alkermes Inc. as head of Pharmacology (1993-1996) where he focused on novel drugs to treat stroke, and also on a permeabilizing agent, RMP-7, that enabled other drugs to treat glioma, and opportunistic infections in AIDS patients. In 1996, he was offered the head of Pharmacology at the biotechnology company, ProScript (1996-2001), where, along with Julian Adams, he co-developed a novel, anti-cancer agent, Velcade (PS-341), currently used to treat multiple myeloma. The clinical program was supported by National Cancer Institute (NCI; Division of Cancer Treatment and Diagnosis, Developmental Therapeutics Program). ProScript was ultimately merged with LeukoSite, and then acquired by Millennium Pharmaceuticals (MLNM- now Takeda) for $635mm. MLNM was subsequently purchased by Takeda who currently market Velcade. Throughout this time, Elliott led the clinical development of PS-341 until its final Phase III trial when it was approved by the FDA, and other regulatory authorities around the world. Elliott was also the project leader of an anti-stroke agent, PS-519, that completed Phase IIa clinical trials. Support for the development of PS-519 was, in part, achieved by Elliott being awarded a $100,000 SBIR grant, and a CRADA contract with the Walter Reed Army Institute of Research.

When leaving Millennium, Elliott was Senior Vice President of Pharmacology & Drug Development. Following the launch of Velcade, Elliott joined a new biotechnology company, CombinatoRx (CRx) as Executive Vice President of Product Development (2001-2005). Here he launched numerous combination products into various inflammatory areas (asthma, psoriasis, rheumatoid arthritis) and oncology. During his time at CRx, Elliott was part of the management team that completed a successful $42 MM IPO as well as gaining $20 MM support from the Singaporean government to start up a new company in Singapore to mimic the CRx model in the USA. In 2005, Peter was recruited to another biotechnology company, Sirtris (2005-2009). The company focused on diseases of ageing including diabetes, oncology and inflammatory conditions. Elliott was part of the management team that completed a $60 MM IPO, and additional rounds of funding. He completed clinical trials in diabetics before the company was acquired by GSK in 2008 for $720 MM. Elliott remained for the transition period, and then left in 2009, at this time he was Head of Research and Development. Subsequently, Elliott set up his own consulting company, Wapiti Pharmaceutical Consulting, Marlboro, MA, USA.

Elliott is the co-author of patents relating to procedures and drugs worked on during his time in academia and within the industrial setting.

== Personal life ==
Elliott married Laura Bird (b 1957. d 2010) in 1983 and has a daughter and a son.
