= Lesley Elliott (field hockey) =

New Zealand field hockey player (born 1960)

Lesley Going
Personal information
- Born: Lesley Anne Elliott; 26 September 1960 (age 66) Taumarunui, New Zealand
- Occupations: Nurse; medical practice manager
- Height: 1.64 m (5 ft 5 in)
- Weight: 63 kg (139 lb)
- Spouse: David Going (m. 1985)
- Children: 2

Sport
- Country: New Zealand
- Sport: Field hockey

Lesley Anne Going (née Elliott; born 26 September 1960) is a former New Zealand field hockey player. She was a member of the national team that finished sixth at the 1984 Summer Olympics in Los Angeles. An Auckland provincial representative, she captained the Auckland team for the first time in 1986.

Born in Taumarunui on 26 September 1960, she became a registered nurse. She married David Going, a general practitioner, in 1985, and the couple went on to have two children. In 2009, they opened an integrated medical centre, Peninsula Medical, in Te Atatu Peninsula, with Lesley Going as practice manager. She has also served as president of the Auckland Hockey Association.
