= Mabel Elliott =

British censor

- Born: Mabel Beatrice Elliott; 9 August 1885; Walthamstow, Essex, United Kingdom (now London)
- Died: 1 January 1944 (aged 58)
- Other names: Maud Phillips

Mabel Beatrice Elliott MBE (9 August 1885 – 9 January 1944), who used the pseudonym Maud Phillips, was a British censor who uncovered a German spy during the First World War.

Born in Walthamstow, Essex (now London), she was educated in London and then the Netherlands and Belgium, she became proficient in a French, Dutch and German.

Her real identity was hidden for many years as she testified under the assumed name Maud Phillips. In 2011, the Royal Society of Chemistry discovered details of her activities during the First World War. During the War, she worked in the newly formed department of Postal Censorship in the War Office; there she became suspicious that a seemingly standard business letter contained a hidden message written in invisible ink. This message was soon discovered to contain a message written by a German spy, Anton Küpferle.

An appeal for more information about Elliott uncovered a surviving family member, her great-niece Rosalind Noble.

Mabel Elliott died on 9 January 1944.
