= Bill Elliott (rugby league) =

Australian rugby league footballer

Personal information
- Full name: William Ernest Elliott
- Born: 24 November 1882 Faversham, Kent, England
- Died: 2 February 1975 (aged 92)

Playing information
- Position: Hooker, Second-row, Lock
Club
Years	Team	Pld	T	G	FG	P
1908–11	Western Suburbs	22	0	0	0	0
- Source: As of 25 June 2019

William Ernest Elliott (1882–1975) was an Australian rugby league footballer who played in the 1900s and 1910s. He played for Western Suburbs in the New South Wales Rugby League (NSWRL) competition. Elliott was a foundation player for Western Suburbs.

== Playing career ==
Elliott made his first grade debut for Western Suburbs against Balmain in Round 1 1908 at Birchgrove Oval which was also the opening week of the New South Wales Rugby League (NSWRL) competition in Australia. Balmain would go on to win the match 24-0. Elliott played in Western Suburbs first ever victory against Newtown in Round 9 1908 at Wentworth Park which ended with a score of 6-5. The win would be Western Suburbs only victory of the season and the club finished second last on the table above last placed Cumberland who were dissolved at the conclusion of the season.

Western Suburbs would go on to finish last in 1909 and 1910. Wests nearly finished last in 1911 but finished just above Balmain on the ladder. Elliott's last game for Wests was against Newtown in Round 12 1911 which Wests won 14-8 at Erskineville Oval, Sydney.
