= John Elliot =

John Elliot may refer to:

- John Elliot (antiquary) (1725–1782), English antiquary
- John Elliot (Royal Navy officer) (1732–1808), Royal Navy admiral, MP for Cockermouth, and governor of Newfoundland
- John Elliot (physician) (1747–1787), English physician and scientist
- John Elliot (brewer) (1765–1829), English brewer and officer of the Westminster Volunteer Cavalry
- John Elliot (Roxburghshire MP) (1788–1862), British politician
- John Elliot (railway manager) (1898–1988), British transport and railway manager
- John Elliot (songwriter) (1914–1972), American songwriter
- John Elliot (author) (1918–1997), British novelist, screenwriter, and television producer

== See also ==
- John Eliot (disambiguation)
- John Elliott (disambiguation)
- Jonathan Elliot (disambiguation)
