= Coast Guard Foundation =

U.S. non-profit organization

- Founded: 1969
- Type: Private
- Location: Stonington, Connecticut
- Key people: Susan Ludwig, Thomas Allegretti
- Website: www.coastguardfoundation.org

The Coast Guard Foundation is a 501(c)(3) non-profit organization that is committed to ensuring all United States Coast Guard members and their families have the resources they need to build resilience throughout their lives. Founded in 1969 to provide funds for academic, athletic, and morale needs of the United States Coast Guard Academy and its cadets, the Foundation expanded its charter to provide resources to members and families that build resilience and strengthen the entire community. The Foundation is governed by a board of trustees from all parts of the country, who in turn elect a board of directors to oversee the Foundation. In addition, the Coast Guard Foundation supports local flotillas in the Coast Guard Auxiliary.

== Activities ==
The Foundation supports the U.S. Coast Guard by providing resources for Guardians, funding scholarships and grants for Coast Guard members and their children and spouses, providing relief in times of natural disaster and tragedy, and supporting the U.S. Coast Guard Academy.

Support for the Academy since 1970 has included funding projects like the waterfront and athletic programs, and academic enrichment programs that provide cadets with equipment that puts them on par with an elite group of other universities.

Foundation supports members and their families, where and when they need it the most.

The Coast Guard Foundation hosts annual events in cities around the country to honor Coast Guard heroism and mission excellence.

== See also ==
- Association of the United States Army
- Air & Space Forces Association
- Space Force Association
- Marine Corps Association
- Coast Guard Auxiliary
- United States Naval Institute
