= Michael Elliott (film critic) =

American film critic

Michael Elliott is an American film critic known for the Christian film-review series Movie Parables, which he began writing in 1998. Elliott's criticism emphasized biblical themes and spiritual lessons in mainstream films rather than focusing primarily on whether a film was appropriate for Christian audiences. His approach was profiled by Christianity Today in 2000 and discussed in a 2002 Orlando Sentinel feature on Christian film-review websites that was subsequently published by the Los Angeles Times.

== Movie Parables and critical style ==
Elliott began writing film reviews in the late 1990s, initially publishing them on his personal website. In a 2000 profile, Christianity Today reported that Crosswalk.com began carrying his Movie Parables reviews within about a year.

Elliott described his reviews as "parables" because he used elements or themes from films as analogies for biblical principles. Rather than concentrating primarily on whether a movie was suitable for Christian viewers, his criticism emphasized how viewers could identify spiritual themes and apply Scripture to what they watched.

Christianity Today reported that Elliott's background in acting and theater arts contributed to an approach that considered both the artistic qualities of films and their potential spiritual analogies.
