= Gwendolyn J. Elliott =

American police officer (1945–2007)

- Born: 1945; Duquesne, Pennsylvania
- Died: May 14, 2007 (aged 62); Pittsburgh, Pennsylvania
- Occupations: police officer, member of United States Armed Forces, mental health professional, founder of Gwen's Girls
- Children: Kathi Elliott, Elder James Elliott
- Mother: Vivian Campbell

Gwendolyn J. Elliott (1945–2007) was an American police officer and founder of Gwen's Girls, a nonprofit organization dedicated to the improving the lives of at-risk young women and girls. She was a member of the first group of women to serve as Pittsburgh Police officers and was that department's first black female commander.

== Early life ==
Gwen was born in Duquesne, Pennsylvania, and graduated from West Mifflin High School. Gwen's mother, Vivian Campbell, died when Gwen was five years old due to an incorrectly performed abortion. Gwen graduated from West Mifflin High School and earned an associate degree from Community College of Allegheny County.

== Career ==
In 1964 Gwen joined the United States Air Force where she served for five years, retiring as a staff sergeant. She later served in the National Guard and the Air Force Reserve for a total of fifteen years of service in the United States Armed Forces. While stationed in the southern United States she experienced racial segregation as well as gender segregation as part of military life.

Following the active-duty portion of her career in the military, Gwen worked as a mental health professional. Then, seeking a field with greater funding stability, she went to apply for a job with the United States Postal Service. While at the post office to apply for a job, someone there remarked that she had good qualifications to apply for a job with the police department. In 1975 a federal judge issued an order that created minimum quotas for white women, black women, and black men hired by the Pittsburgh Bureau of Police. In 1976 Gwen began her career with the Pittsburgh police along with 11 other women, the department's first female officers. In 1986 she became the department's first black female commander.

Gwen was a determined and goal-oriented officer. In a story published in the Pittsburgh Post-Gazette, Gwen is quoted as saying

"At no period was I ready to give up. I never thought about quitting. Those men who didn't cooperate with us in the early years made us smarter quicker. I was determined I was going to feed my babies, I was going to succeed."

Her determination inspired others on the force. In a 2012 Point Park University Alumni Profile, then Assistant Chief of Investigations for the Pittsburgh Police Maurita Bryant is quoted as saying of Elliott

“She cared about everyone. She would give you the shirt off her back. She was smart as a whip. No matter how much people talked about her or tried to demean her, she kept her head up. She kept going."

While serving on the police force Gwen was determined to find a way to improve the quality of life of the young women and girls who came to the attention of the police. She wanted to help not only these young women and girls, but also their children and subsequent generations. Gwen retired from the police department in 2002 after 26 years of service, and in the same year she founded Gwen's Girls, a nonprofit organization dedicated solely to the needs of at-risk young women and girls. After retirement, she also continued to mentor women police officers and served as an adjunct professor at Point Park University. She served on dozens of boards and received many women's leadership and public service awards.

== Death ==
Gwendolyn J. Elliott died from cancer on May 14, 2007, at age sixty-two in her home in the Highland Park neighborhood of Pittsburgh.
