= Charles Henry Elliott-Smith =

Officer in the Royal Air Force

- Born: 6 October 1889
- Died: 14 January 1994 (aged 104)
- Military career
- Allegiance: United Kingdom
- Branch: Royal Air Force
- Rank: Air Commodore
- Commands: No.193 Training Squadron; No.55 Squadron; No.56 Squadron; No.504 Squadron; No.9 Flying Train School; No.22 Air School (South Africa); No.21 Group SAAF
- Conflicts: World War I World War II
- Awards: AFC

Air Commodore Charles Henry Elliott-Smith AFC (1889–1994) was a senior officer in the Royal Air Force who served in World War I and World War II. He was awarded the Air Force Cross in 1919, and was made a Commander of the Order of George I, by the King of Greece, in 1944.

== Life ==
Charles Henry Elliott-Smith was born on 6 October 1889 and educated at Bedford Modern School.

Elliott-Smith joined the British Army as a Second Lieutenant in the Bedfordshire Regiment in 1915. He enrolled early in the Royal Flying Corps, where he was made Captain in 1916, Major in 1918, and was awarded the Air Force Cross in 1919. Elliott-Smith was made Group Captain in 1935 and later Air Commodore.

Elliott-Smith was made a Commander of the Order of George I by the King of Greece in 1944. He died on 14 January 1994 as one of the oldest surviving former members of the Royal Air Force.
