= Milton Courtright Elliott =

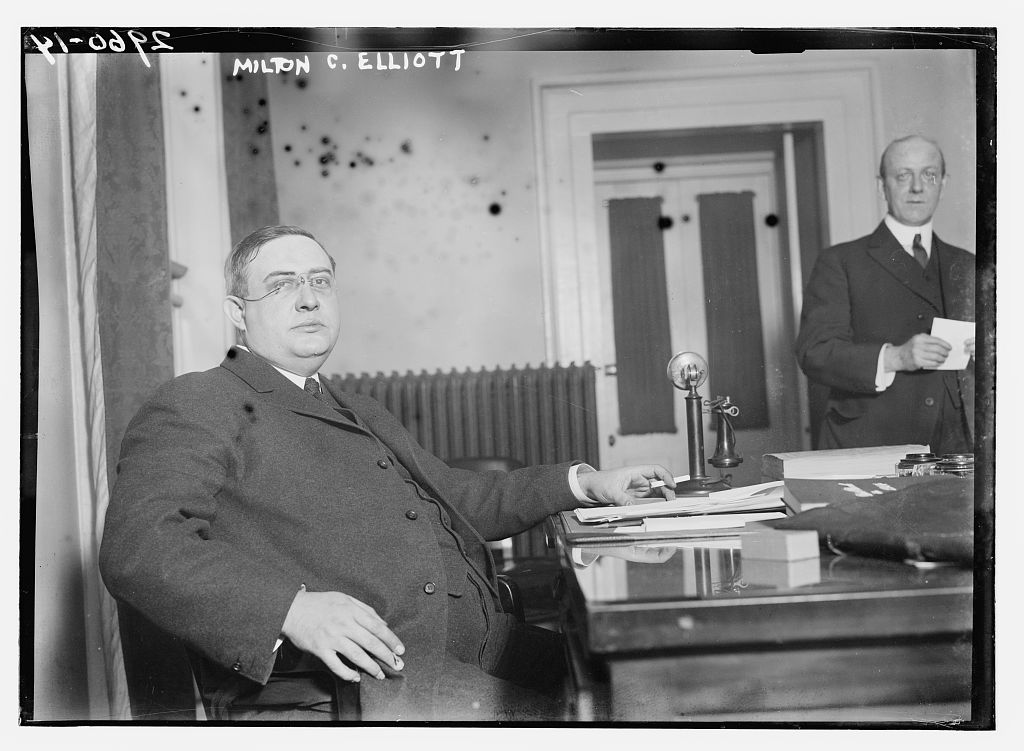

Milton Courtright Elliott (December 28, 1879 – 1928) was an American lawyer and judge from Norfolk, Virginia. He became counsel to the Federal Reserve Board.

== Biography ==
He was born on December 28, 1879, in Norfolk, Virginia, to Warren Grice Elliott (1848-1906) and Margaret Blow. His father was president of the Atlantic Coast Line Railroad. He graduated from the University of Virginia in 1902.

He married Lucy Hamilton Cocke on December 19, 1906. He became counsel to the Federal Reserve Board.

He died in 1928.
