= Geoff Elliott (footballer) =

Australian rules footballer

Personal information
- Full name: Geoff Elliott
- Born: 6 August 1939
- Original team: St Kilda reserves
- Height: 184 cm (6 ft 0 in)
- Weight: 85 kg (187 lb)
- Position: Defence

Playing career^{1}
Years	Club	Games (Goals)
1962–63	Fitzroy	9 (3)
- ^{1} Playing statistics correct to the end of 1963.

Geoff Elliott (born 6 August 1939) is a former Australian rules footballer who played with Fitzroy in the Victorian Football League (VFL).
