= Emily Louise Orr Elliott =

Canadian artist

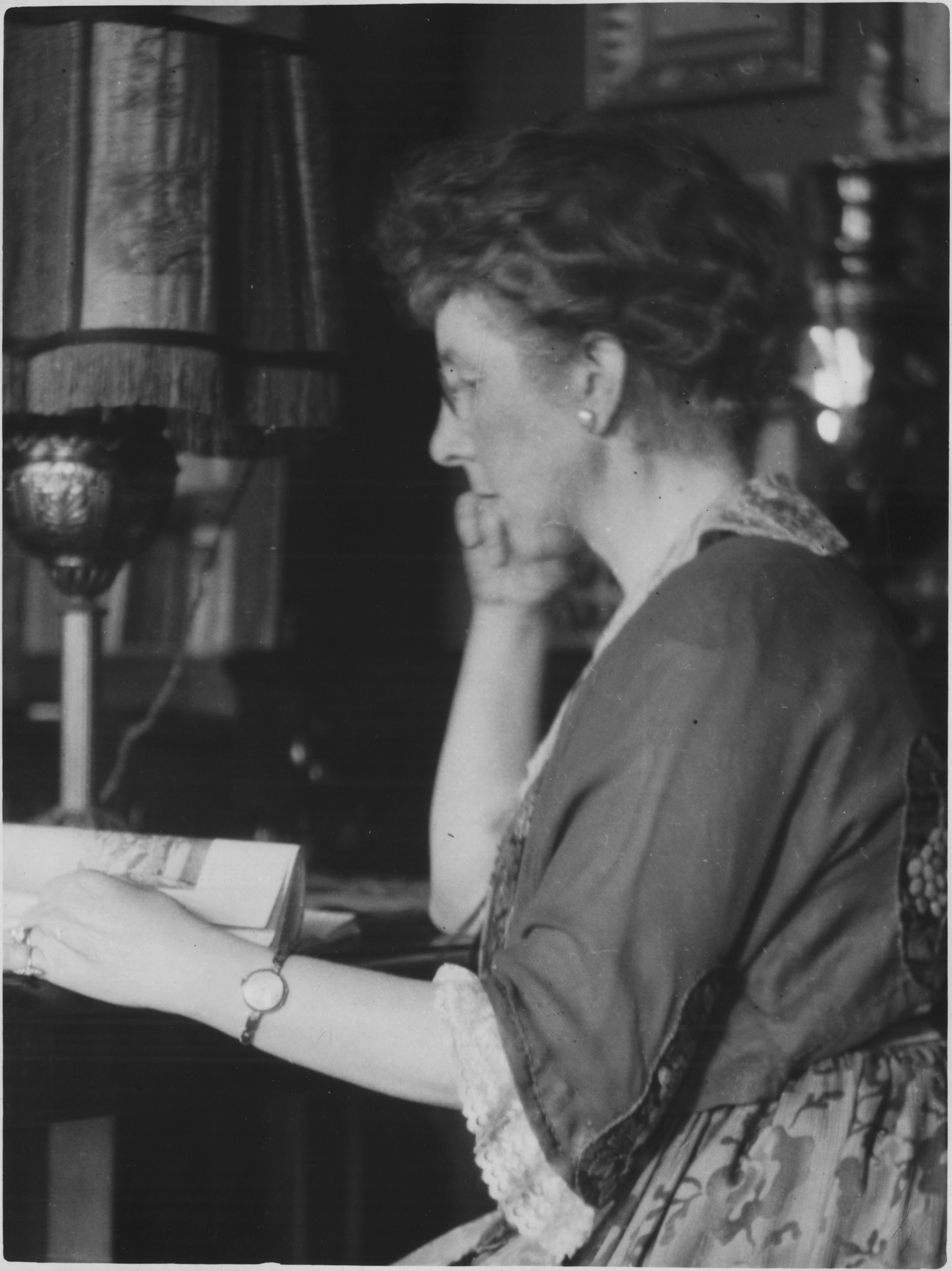
- Emily Louise Elliott, 1930
- Born: July 22, 1867; Montreal, Quebec, Canada
- Died: February 27, 1952 (aged 84); Toronto, Ontario, Canada
- Known for: Graphic artist, Illustrator

Emily Louise Orr Elliott (July 22, 1867 – February 27, 1952) was a Canadian artist and fashion illustrator.

== Career ==
She was born Emily Louise Orr in Montreal and studied at the Ontario School of Art in Toronto, the Art Students League of New York and the New York School of Design. Besides her oil paintings of figures, landscapes and flowers, she also provided sketches for the Eaton's and Simpson's catalogues and illustrated fashion designs for newspapers and magazines. Elliott also wrote a column on boats and boating for the Toronto Star, composed songs and lectured on art.

Her work was exhibited at the Royal Canadian Academy of Arts, the Ontario Society of Artists, the Women's Art Association of Canada and the Canadian National Exhibition. She was founding chair of the Women's Committee of the Canadian National Exhibition. Her work is on display in Victoria College, Emmanuel College, St. Hilda's College, the Queen Elizabeth Hospital and the Toronto Women's Press Club as well as held in the collections of the City of Toronto Market Gallery and the Toronto Public Library

In 1893, she married John Ephraim Elliott; the couple had one son.

She died in Toronto at the age of 84.

Her collection of art published by other illustrators was donated to the Art Gallery of Ontario.
