= William Elliott (cricketer) =

English cricketer

Personal information
- Full name: William Elliott
- Born: 15 November 1842; Bulwell, Nottinghamshire, England
- Died: 1891 (aged 48–49); Winchester, Hampshire, England
- Batting: Right-handed
- Bowling: Right-arm fast

Domestic team information
- Years: Team
- 1871: Nottinghamshire

Career statistics
Competition	First-class
Matches	3
Runs scored	12
Batting average	3.00
100s/50s	–/–
Top score	5
Balls bowled	132
Wickets	2
Bowling average	36.50
5 wickets in innings	–
10 wickets in match	–
Best bowling	1/18
Catches/stumpings	–/–
- Source: Cricinfo, 22 February 2013

William Elliott (15 November 1842 – 1891) was an English cricketer. Elliott was a right-handed batsman who bowled right-arm fast. He was born at Bulwell, Nottinghamshire.

Elliott made his first-class debut for Richard Daft's XI against a United North of England Eleven at the Recreation Ground, Holbeck in 1870. The following season he made two first-class appearances for Nottinghamshire against Gloucestershire at Clifton College, and Surrey at The Oval. He scored a total of 12 runs in his three first-class appearances, as well as taking two wickets.
