= Hillary Elliott =

Canadian modern pentathlete (born 1998)

Personal information
- Born: 23 June 1998 (age 28) London, Ontario, Canada

Sport
- Sport: Modern pentathlon

Hillary Elliott (born June 23, 1998, in London, Ontario) is a Canadian modern pentathlete. She competed at several World cups, international events, along with the 2015 Pan American Games.
