= Judith Elliott =

Judith Ann Elliott was appointed to the Provincial Court of Manitoba on July 26, 2000.

Prior to her appointment to the bench, Judge Elliott worked as a staff lawyer for Legal Aid Manitoba. She practised law for 17 years. She primarily worked in the area of criminal law, focusing on matters involving domestic violence. Judge Elliott has been a member of the Family Violence Court Steering Committee, which was responsible for monitoring the ongoing work of the Family Violence Court.
