= Ricky Elliott =

American racing driver (born 1965)

- Born: Rick T. Elliott; October 9, 1965 (age 61)
- Retired: 2018
- Debut season: 1970

Late model
- Years active: 2005-2018
- Car number: 88
- Championships: 1
- Wins: 106

Previous series
- 1987-2004 Car number Championships Wins 1970-1986 Wins: Modified racing 0,1,19D,30,45,85,91; 6; 139; Kart racing 135

Championship titles
- 1991, 1992 Delaware State Fair Champion; 1985 World Karting Association Gold Cup

Ricky Elliott (born October 9. 1965) is a retired American Kart, Dirt Modified, and Late Model racing driver. Elliott has 245 feature events wins from 15 tracks in the Mid-Atlantic (United States).

== Racing career ==
Elliott began racing karts at an early age, winning 135 World Karting Association events, including both Maryland and Delaware state championships and the national Horstman Gold Cup. He then began racing modifieds and in 1987 claimed his first feature win at the Delaware International Speedway (DIS).

Elliott won often in his home state, including the state fairgrounds, and claimed back to back track championships at both DIS and Georgetown Speedway in 1990 and 1991, repeating at Georgetown in 1993 and 1994 He also competed regularly at New Jersey's East Windsor and Bridgeport Speedways, and found success at major events held at North Carolina's Charlotte Motor Speedway dirt track and the Syracuse Mile in New York.

In 2005, Elliott then turned his attention to the Late Model race cars, winning at many of the same tracks he conquered with his modified. He also claimed victories at Allegany County Speedway and Potomac Speedway in Maryland, New Egypt Speedway in New Jersey, Halifax County Motor Speedway in North Carolina, and a World of Outlaws win at Brewerton Speedway in New York. Elliott capped off his career by retiring after winning the 2018 DIS track championship.
