= Robert Elliott (priest) =

Irish Anglican priest

Robert Elliott, D.D. (1658-1735) was an Irish Anglican priest.

Elliott was born in Kilkenny and educated at the Trinity College, Dublin. He was appointed as the Prebendary of Leighlin Cathedral in 1710, the Treasurer of Ferns from 1714 to 1717, and then the Archdeacon of Ferns. He then held both the positions, the dean and the prebend, until his death in 1735.
