= Harrison S. Elliott =

Harrison Sacket Elliott (13 December 1882 – 25 June 1951) was an American ordained Methodist minister, and taught at Union Theological Seminary from 1922 to 1950. His interest in the interplay of psychology, group dynamics, democratic thinking, and liberal theology found expression in his leadership in the Y.M.C.A., ecumenical agencies, the Religious Education Association, and Union Theological Seminary. Elliot was born in St. Clairsville, Ohio.

== Works ==
- Student Standards of Action (1914)
- Report of Progress, Commission on Bible Study and Other Christian Education Books (1916)
- How to Ensure the Best Leadership of the Bible Study Work (1917)
- The Leadership of Red Triangle Groups (1918)
- A New World Democracy (1918)
- Training an Adequate Leadership for Voluntary Discussion Groups (1918)
- New Testament Ideals for the Present World Task (with A.B. Curry, 1918)
- First Aid on Bible Discussion Groups (1919)
- How Jesus Met Life Questions (1920)
- The Why and How of Group Discussion (1926)
- Eight Ways of Organizing Activity Programs (with A.J. Gregg, 1926)
- Methods for Group Leaders to Guide Development of Christian Citizenship in Boys Groups (with A.J. Gregg, 1926)
- Program Suggestions for Christian Citizenship (with A.J. Gregg, 1926)
- Trends in Boys' Work of the Y.M.C.A. (with A.J. Gregg, 1926)
- The Bearing of Psychology on Religion (1927)
- The Process of Group Thinking (1928)
- Group Discussion in Religious Education (1930)
- Unemployment - a Discussion Outline (1931)
- Solving Personal Problems (with Grace L. Elliot, 1936)
- Can Religious Education Be Christian? (1940)
- Present Conflicts in Protestant Christian Education (1940)
- The Y.M.C.A. of the Future (1940)
- Youth and the War (1942)
- Suggested Syllabus on Religion in Higher Education (1947)
- Democracy in Educational Practices (1947)
