= Ray Elliott (cricketer) =

Australian cricketer

Personal information
- Born: 1 January 1917; New Norfolk, Tasmania, Australia
- Died: 8 September 1997 (aged 80); New Town, Tasmania, Australia

Domestic team information
- Years: Team
- 1945-1946: Tasmania
- Source: Cricinfo, 7 March 2016

Ray Elliott (1 January 1917 – 8 September 1997) was an Australian cricketer. He played one first-class match for Tasmania in 1945/46.

== See also ==
- List of Tasmanian representative cricketers
