= Bruce Elliott (footballer) =

Australian rules footballer

Personal information
- Full name: Bruce Elliott
- Born: 30 July 1956 (age 70)
- Original team: Yea / Scotch College
- Height: 188 cm (6 ft 2 in)
- Weight: 82 kg (181 lb)

Playing career^{1}
Years	Club	Games (Goals)
1979–80	Melbourne	5 (0)
- ^{1} Playing statistics correct to the end of 1980.

Bruce Elliott (born 30 July 1956) is a former Australian rules footballer who played with Melbourne in the Victorian Football League (VFL).
