= Morrie Elliott =

Australian rules footballer

Personal information
- Full name: Morrie Elliott
- Born: 2 October 1935 (age 91)
- Original team: Seymour
- Height: 193 cm (6 ft 4 in)
- Weight: 94 kg (207 lb)

Playing career^{1}
Years	Club	Games (Goals)
1961	South Melbourne	1 (0)
- ^{1} Playing statistics correct to the end of 1961.

Morrie Elliott (born 2 October 1935) is a former Australian rules footballer who played with South Melbourne in the Victorian Football League (VFL).
