= Susan Elliott (academic) =

Australian academic (born 1958)

Susan Leigh Elliott AM (born 1 June 1958) is an Australian academic specialising in medical education. From 2017, she served as the deputy vice-chancellor and vice-president for education at Monash University in Melbourne, Australia. She was previously the deputy vice-chancellor at the University of Melbourne.

In June 2021 Elliott was appointed the Provost and Senior Vice-President of Monash University. In 2025, it was announced that she would retire at the conclusion of her term in 2026.

On October 7, 2026 Elliott was appointed Acting Vice-Chancellor at Deakin University pending the appointment of a permanent replacement.

== Biography ==
Elliott holds degrees in medicine and surgery, and a doctorate in medicine, from the University of Melbourne. She also holds qualifications in health economics and higher education from Monash University and the University of New South Wales.

She is a fellow of the Royal Australasian College of Physicians.

Elliott was the first Australian and first woman elected to lead the Asia Pacific Association for International Education, a regional association for international higher education.

=== Recognition ===
In 2018 Elliott was appointed a Member of the Order of Australia for significant service to education, including as an academic administrator, a clinician in gastroenterology and service to educational institutions in Asia-Pacific.
