= Jane Elliott (choreographer) =

American dancer and choreographer (born 1970)

Jane Elliott (born March 7, 1970) is an American dancer and choreographer for stage and film.
