= George Elliott (cricketer) =

English cricketer

Personal information
- Full name: George Frederick Elliott
- Born: 1 May 1850; Farnham, Surrey
- Died: 23 April 1913 (aged 62); Farnham, Surrey
- Batting: Right-handed
- Bowling: Right-arm fast

Domestic team information
- Years: Team
- 1874: Kent
- 1875–1880: Surrey
- FC debut: 17 July 1874 Kent v Lancashire
- Last FC: 6 September 1880 United South of England Eleven v North

Career statistics
| Competition | First-class |
|---|---|
| Matches | 51 |
| Runs scored | 1,163 |
| Batting average | 13.69 |
| 100s/50s | 0/4 |
| Top score | 53 |
| Balls bowled | 904 |
| Wickets | 8 |
| Bowling average | 60.62 |
| 5 wickets in innings | 0 |
| 10 wickets in match | 0 |
| Best bowling | 1/2 |
| Catches/stumpings | 9/– |
- Source: CricInfo, 14 June 2022

George Frederick Elliott (1 May 1850 – 23 April 1913) was an English cricketer who played county cricket between 1874 and 1880.

Elliot was born at Farnham in Surrey in 1850, the son of George and Ellen Elliot (née Attfield). His father was a blacksmith and engineer who operated a business in Farnham. Elliot followed his father into the business and ran the family firm until his death as well as setting up another reengineering business in Farnham; at the 1911 census, shortly before his death, he described himself as a mechanical engineer. His father was also a cricketer who had played for teams in the Farnham area, and for Players of Surrey at The Oval in 1849.

During 1874 Elliott worked as an engine fitter and turner at the Royal Arsenal, Woolwich, then in Kent. He had played for Colts of Surrey in 1871 and 1872. Whilst at Woolwich, he played club cricket for the nearby New Cross Albion. He had a reputation as an "enterprising batsman" and made his first-class cricket debut for Kent County Cricket Club during 1874 in a match against Lancashire at Old Trafford. He played two matches for Kent during the season before playing for his native Surrey County Cricket Club between 1875 and 1880. He played 44 first-class matches for Surrey and made a total of 51 first-class appearances in his career, including playing for the South against the North in 1876. He played club cricket and at least 12 times for the United South of England Eleven, including three times in first-class matches. He was described in his Wisden obituary as being "a sound batsman" and "a useful change bowler" who could bat patiently.

Elliott was married at least twice in his life. He was a well-known member of the Farnham volunteer fire brigade. He died at Farnham in 1913 aged 62.

== Bibliography ==
- Carlaw, Derek (2020). Kent County Cricketers, A to Z: Part One (1806–1914) (PDF). Cardiff: ACS.
