= Paul Elliott (rugby league) =

Australian rugby league footballer

Personal information
- Born: 5 December 1960 (age 64)

Playing information
- Position: Second-row
Club
Years	Team	Pld	T	G	FG	P
1982	Illawarra Steelers	4	0	0	0	0
1983–87	Canberra Raiders	74	5	0	1	21
	Total	78	5	0	1	21

Paul Elliott (born 5 December 1960) is an Australia former professional rugby league footballer who played in the 1980s. He played for Illawarra and Canberra in the New South Wales Rugby League (NSWRL) competition.

== Playing career ==
=== 1982 ===
In 1982, 21-year-old Elliott made his professional football debut with the Illawarra Steelers in Round 23 against the Canberra Raiders (the team he would later player most of his career for). Illawarra lost that game 19–26, after leading by 2 at the half-time break. The Steelers, at the time, were playing their first ever season, along with the Raiders. Elliott would play for the Steelers for the last 3 rounds of the season, eventually starting his first game as a second-rower in a Round 25 match-up against the Cronulla-Sutherland Sharks. Illawarra finished second from last and did not qualify for the postseason.

=== 1983 ===
Elliott signed with Canberra (the holders of the wooden spoon the previous year) in 1983. He played his first game with the club off the bench in a Round 9 loss against the Manly Warringah Sea Eagles. He became a regular starter at second row for Canberra after Round 14 (which was coincidentally against his former club the Steelers). The Canberra side finished 10th for the season.

=== 1984 ===
He scored his first career try against the Western Suburbs Magpies in Round 2 in 1984. Elliott's try helped the Canberra side defeat Western Suburbs 22–12. 12 rounds later, Elliott scored his final try of the season against Cronulla. The Canberra side finished 6th, qualifying for the finals in the first time in club history. Their postseason campaign didn't last long however, as they lost to the South Sydney Rabbitohs 23–4. Elliott concluded the season with two tries from 20 appearances.

=== 1985 ===
1985 saw a successful year for Elliott, despite playing fewer minutes and being relegated from his starting role. In Round 16, he scored in a lopsided 42–12 win against the North Sydney Bears. The next game, Elliott scored the first and only field goal of his career in a win against South Sydney. In Round 18, he scored a try in a game against the Penrith Panthers. The Penrith club were up 22–6 at half-time and Canberra scored 16 points in the second half, but could not win, losing the game 22–28. Elliott made 22 appearances for the season, scoring 3 tries and a field goal.

=== Later years (1986 and 1987) ===
In 1986, Elliott played 12 games in an unsuccessful Raiders season when the team finished 11th. Elliott did not score any tries for the season.

He played his final season in 1987. He only made two appearances for the season (round 7 and 25), playing his final game coming off the bench against South Sydney. It was a one-sided match with the Canberra side winning 26–2. Elliott retired at the age of 26. The Raiders lost the grand final against the Sea Eagles 18–8. Elliott concluded his career with 5 tries and a field goal (21 points) from 78 appearances.
