= Alan Elliott =

Australian rules footballer

Personal information
- Full name: Alan Elliott
- Born: 11 June 1925
- Died: 20 May 2006 (aged 80)
- Original team: Coburg
- Height: 178 cm (5 ft 10 in)
- Weight: 80 kg (176 lb)

Playing career^{1}
Years	Club	Games (Goals)
1945–1947	Geelong	20 (10)
- ^{1} Playing statistics correct to the end of 1947.

Alan Elliott (11 June 1925 – 20 May 2006) was an Australian rules footballer who played for the Geelong Football Club in the Victorian Football League (VFL).
