= Francis Elliott (archdeacon) =

The Ven. Francis William Thomas Elliott was Archdeacon of Berbice from 1908 until 1911. The post then remained vacant for 27 years.

Elliott was educated at St Augustine's College, Canterbury and ordained in 1877. After a curacy at All Saints, Berbice he held incumbencies at Buxton, Demerara and Berbice. On his return from British Guiana he was Chaplain at St Marylebone Hospital.
