= John Elliott (cricketer) =

English cricketer

Personal information
- Full name: John William Elliott
- Born: 12 February 1942 (age 84); Diglis, Worcester, England
- Batting: Left-handed
- Role: wicket-keeper

Career statistics
Competition	First-class
Matches	10
Runs scored	66
Batting average	8.25
100s/50s	0/0
Top score	18*
Catches/stumpings	18/8
- Source: CricketArchive, 18 October 2007

John William Elliott (born 12 February 1942) was an English cricketer who played ten first-class matches for Worcestershire between 1959 and 1965, although he played for the county's Second XI as late as 1971. He later went on to serve as president for the same club for 2 years and chairman for 8 years. During this time, he oversaw the signing of Glenn McGrath, Andy Bichel, Moeen Ali, Zaheer Khan and Gareth Batty. He made his first-class debut against Somerset aged just 17, though then did not play at that level again for two years.

Elliott claimed six of his 26 first-class dismissals in a single match, and five in a single innings. This feat came against the Pakistan Eaglets in 1963.
