= Robert Elliott (actor, born 1944) =

American actor (1944–2004)

- Born: June 2, 1944; Arizona, U.S.
- Died: December 25, 2004 (aged 60); Tucson, Arizona, U.S.
- Occupation: Actor
- Years active: 1978–2001

Robert Elliott (June 2, 1944 – December 25, 2004) was an American actor. He is known for his roles in the movies Animal House (1978), Flashpoint (1984) and Vixen Highway (2001). He died on December 25, 2004, in Tucson, Arizona.
