= Ray Elliott (rugby) =

Australian rugby player (1897–1977)

- Full name: Alma Raymond Elliott
- Born: 1 January 1897 Sydney, New South Wales, Australia
- Died: 30 May 1977 (aged 80)
- Height: 6 ft (183 cm)
- Weight: 13 st (182 lb; 83 kg)

Rugby union career
- Position(s): Flanker, lock
Senior career
Years	Team	Apps	(Points)
1919-24	Glebe-Balmain		
International career
Years	Team	Apps	(Points)
1920-23	Australia	13	(0)
- Rugby league career

Playing information
- Position: Second-row
Club
Years	Team	Pld	T	G	FG	P
1925–29	Balmain	58	7	0	0	21

Alma Raymond Elliott (1 January 1897 – 30 May 1977) was a rugby union and rugby league player who represented the Australia national rugby union team and played rugby league for Balmain in the 1920s.

== Playing career ==
=== Rugby union ===
Elliott first played rugby union as a schoolboy at Stanmore. After enlisting with the Australian Imperial Force in 1915 and serving overseas, Elliott played for Glebe-Balmain from 1919 to 1924. He represented Australia in 13 Tests between 1920 and 1923.

Elliott was readmitted to rugby union in 1932. He was appointed coach of Drummoyne (formerly Glebe-Balmain) in 1952.

=== Rugby league ===
Elliott converted to rugby league in 1925, playing for Balmain until 1929.
