= Susan J. Elliott =

American psychologist

- Born: Susan Jean Elliott; November 19, 1956 (age 69); New York City, U.S.
- Education: Juris Doctor – Berkeley Law; M.Ed. – Cambridge College; A.B. English (magna cum laude; ΦΒΚ) – Mount Holyoke College
- Occupations: Author; Media commentator; Lawyer
- Spouses: unknown (–1987; divorced); Michael A. DiCarlo (1996–2009; his death)

Susan J. Elliott (born November 19, 1956) is an American author, media commentator, and lawyer from New York City. She wrote the book, Getting Past Your Breakup: How to Turn a Devastating Loss Into the Best Thing That Ever Happened to You.

== Personal life and education ==
Susan Jean Elliott was born on November 19, 1956, in New York City and grew up in the Bronx. She was in foster care and was adopted at the age of eight. She says that as a young adult, she involved herself in dangerous and destructive relationships.

She married and had sons with her first husband, whom she divorced in 1987. She earned a Bachelor of Arts degree in English from Mount Holyoke College, where she became a member of Phi Beta Kappa and graduated magna cum laude. She went on to earn a Master of Education degree from Cambridge College, and a Juris Doctor degree from the UC Berkeley School of Law. She was admitted to practice law in New York in 2005.

She married Michael A. DiCarlo on November 23, 1996. When he died in 2009 from brain cancer, she established the Michael A. DiCarlo Memorial Fund with the National Brain Tumor Society.

== Writing and speaking career ==
Elliot's book, Getting Past Your Breakup: How to Turn A Devastating Loss Into the Best Thing That Ever Happened to You (Da Capo Press Lifelong Learning Books, May 2009) details the program she created for dealing with breakups and divorce. The book compares the impact of a breakup to the impact of a death and recommends similar approaches to grief counseling. The book was selected as the top 2009 breakup book by About.com. As of May 25, 2013, the book was in 161 libraries according to WorldCat.

She appears as a relationship expert, and has been quoted in the Chicago Tribune and Glamour. She started "Heartbreak Bootcamp", an intensive six week course designed for those having difficulty moving on, performs presentations, and gives weekend seminars.
