= Francis Perry Elliott =

Writer

Francis Perry Elliott (July 29, 1861 – August 13, 1924) was an American writer and educator. Some of his works were adapted to film. His novel Pals First was staged and adapted into two films. Frederick Townsend Martin illustrated his book The Haunted Pajamas.

== Early life ==
Elliott was born on July 29, 1861, in Nashville, Tennessee. His parents were William F. and Mary E. Elliott.

Elliott attended Montgomery Bell Academy and Vanderbilt University.

== Career ==
From 1883 to 1890, Elliott worked at schools in Tennessee and Mississippi, either as a teacher or superintendent. In Jackson, Tennessee, Elliot was head of a high school. He worked as a professor of English literature at Belmont University for six years.

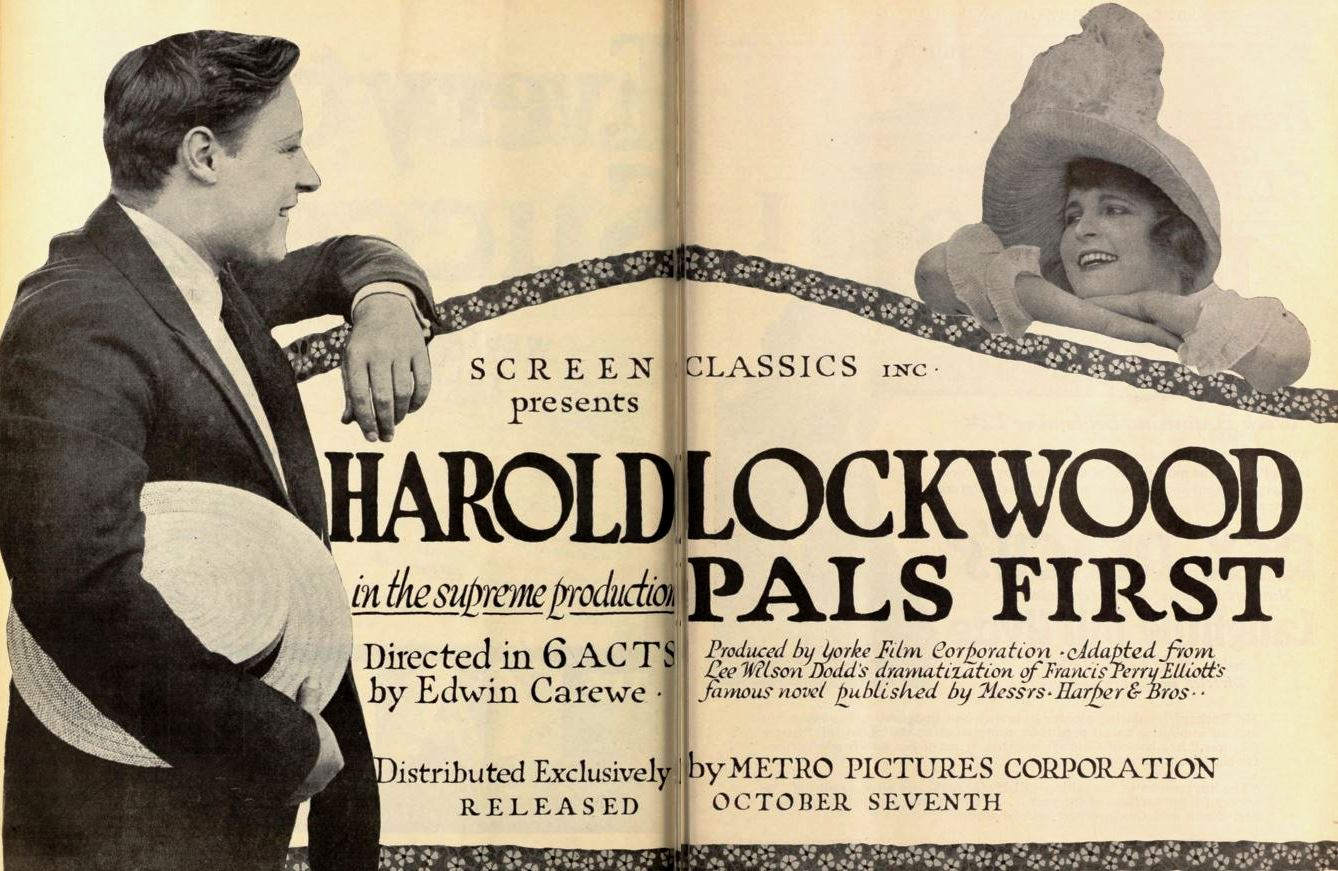
Advertisement for 1918 film Pals First

From 1896 to 1898, Elliott was headmaster of a school in Tarrytown, New York. From 1898 to 1900, he was associated with the publisher Harper Brothers. He edited magazines including Home, The New Age, and The Great Southwest.

== Personal life ==
Elliott married Winifred McKenzie Payne of Keokuk, Iowa on September 22, 1897.

== Writings ==
- The Gift of Abou Hassan (1912)
- Pals First; A Tale of Love and Comradery
- The Haunted Pajamas
- Lend Me Your Name! The Reully & Britton Co. Chicago (1917) illustrated by Carman Thomson
- The Shadow Girl

== Filmography ==
- The Square Deceiver (1917)
- The Haunted Pajamas (1917)
- The Square Deceiver (1917)
- Pals First (1918)
- Lend Me Your Name (1918)
- Pals First (1926)
