= Ray Elliott (footballer) =

Welsh footballer

Personal information
- Full name: Raymond John Elliott
- Date of birth: 23 March 1929
- Place of birth: Ystrad, Rhondda, Wales], England
- Position: Centre forward

Senior career*
Years	Team	Apps	(Gls)
- Woking
1947–1949	Millwall	2	(0)
- Headington United
- * Club domestic league appearances and goals

Raymond John Elliott (born 23 March 1929), known as Jack Elliott, is a Welsh footballer who played as a centre forward in the Football League.
