= George Elliott (spy) =

English spy

George Eliot was an English spy in the reign of Queen Elizabeth I.

Eliot is reported to have been an unsavoury character. He earned his living as a confidence trickster, but was well known as a rapist and suspected of being a murderer. He entered the service of Robert Dudley, 1st Earl of Leicester as a spy to avoid a charge of the last crime and agreed to seek out recusant Catholics and hand them over to the authorities.

At Lyford Grange in Berkshire (now Oxfordshire), he tracked down the Jesuit priest, Edmund Campion. After calling for a magistrate from Abingdon with re-inforcements, he arrested him and sent him to London for trial and execution.
