= John Elliott (physician) =

British physician

John Elliott, M.D. (fl. 1690) was a British physician, an adherent of James II.

== Life ==
Elliott was created M.D. of the University of Cambridge by royal mandate in 1681, and incorporated in that degree at the University of Oxford on 11 July 1683. Having been constituted a fellow of the Royal College of Physicians by the charter of James II, he was admitted as such 25 June 1687, and at the general election of officers for that year he was appointed censor.

Elliott spoke openly of the Prince of Orange as a traitor and usurper. For publishing and dispersing on 10 June 1689 what purported to be A Declaration of His Most Sacred Majesty King James the Second, to all His Loving Subjects in the Kingdom of England, "given at Our Court in Dublin Castle the eighth day of May 1689 in the fifth year of our reign", he, along with Sir Adam Blair, Captain Henry Vaughan, Captain Frederick Mole, and Robert Gray, M.D., was impeached by the House of Commons of high treason and other crimes and offences, and committed to Newgate Prison. After appearing at the bar of the House of Lords, counsel were assigned him, and he was formally remanded, 4 July, to await the trial. No trial, however, took place.

Elliott was detained in custody until 9 April 1690, when, by giving bail to the amount of £10,000, he regained his liberty. In the following December his bail was, upon his petition, ordered to be discharged. Elliott's name does not appear on the college list for 1693.
