= George Elliott (gridiron football) =

American football player and coach (born 1932)

Biographical details
- Born: July 3, 1932 (age 94); Muskogee, Oklahoma, U.S.

Playing career
- 1951: Oklahoma
- 1952–1954: Northeastern State
- 1955: Winnipeg Blue Bombers
- Positions: Quarterback, halfback

Coaching career (HC unless noted)
- 1958–1962: Chickasha HS (OK)
- 1963–1974: Northeastern State (assistant)
- 1975–1986: Northeastern State

Head coaching record
- Overall: 85–35–3 (college)
- Tournaments: 3–3 (NAIA D-I playoffs)

Accomplishments and honors

Championships
- 4 OIC (1980–1983)

George Elliott (born July 3, 1932) is an American former football player and coach. He served as the head football coach at Northeastern State University in Tahlequah, Oklahoma from 1975 to 1986, compiling a record of 85–35–3.

Elliott played one season in 1955 for the Winnipeg Blue Bombers of the Canadian Football League.

== Head coaching record ==
=== College ===
Year	Team	Overall	Conference	Standing	Bowl/playoffs
Northeastern State Redmen (Oklahoma Intercollegiate Conference) (1975–1966)
1975	Northeastern State	7–3	2–3	T–3rd	
1976	Northeastern State	6–3–1	3–1	2nd	
1977	Northeastern State	4–5–1	2–2	3rd	
1978	Northeastern State	6–3–1	1–2–1	T–3rd	
1979	Northeastern State	8–2	2–2	3rd	
1980	Northeastern State	11–2	3–1	T–1st	L NAIA Division I Championship
1981	Northeastern State	9–1	3–1	1st	
1982	Northeastern State	11–1	4–0	1st	L NAIA Division I Semifinal
1983	Northeastern State	8–2	4–0	1st	L NAIA Division I Quarterfinal
1984	Northeastern State	5–4	2–2	3rd	
1985	Northeastern State	6–4	2–2	3rd	
1986	Northeastern State	4–5	2–2	T–3rd	
Northeastern State:		85–35–3	30–18–1		
Total:		85–35–3			
National championship Conference title Conference division title or championship game berth
