= Paul Elliott (epidemiologist) =

Paul Elliott CBE FRS
- Born: April 1954 (age 72)
- Title: Professor of Epidemiology and Public Health Medicine

Academic work
- Discipline: Epidemiologist
- Institutions: Imperial College London

Paul Elliott (born April 1954) is a British epidemiologist and academic. He has been Professor of Epidemiology and Public Health Medicine at Imperial College London since 1995. He is director of REACT (Real-time Assessment of Community Transmission), a community coronavirus testing programme. He is also director of the National Institute for Health Research (NIHR) Health Protection Research Unit for Chemical and Radiation Threats & Hazards.

He studied medicine and mathematics at the University of Cambridge, graduating with Bachelor of Medicine, Bachelor of Surgery (MBBS) degrees. He then studied epidemiology at London School of Hygiene & Tropical Medicine (LSHTM), graduating with a Master of Science (MSc) degree in 1983. He remained at LSHTM and completed a Doctor of Philosophy (PhD) degree in 1991; his doctoral supervisor was Professor Geoffrey Rose.

Elliott was appointed Commander of the Order of the British Empire (CBE) in the 2021 Birthday Honours for services to scientific research in public health. He was elected a Fellow of the Royal Society in 2024. He is also a Fellow of the Academy of Medical Sciences (FMedSci).
