= Elliot =

- Pronunciation: /ˈɛliət/
- Gender: Unisex
- Language: English, Breton

Origin
- Origin: Scotland (c. 1300 AD); England (1180 AD); Brittany, France (before 1066 AD)

Other names
- Alternative spelling: Elliotte; Elliott; Eliott; Eliot; Elyot
- Variant form: Ellie

Elliot (also spelled Eliot, Elliotte, Elliott, Eliott and Elyot) is a personal name that can serve as either a surname or a given name. Although the given name has historically been given to males, females have increasingly been given the name as well in the United States.

The main difference is the surname, which has two roots: The Borderlands of Scotland, where the Clan Eliott was located, and Brittany, from where Bretons emigrated to southern England, initially during the invasion of England by William the Conqueror in 1066.

== Surname origin ==
=== Scotland ===
The origin of the Scottish surname is obscure, due to much of the genealogy of the Eliott clan being burnt in the destruction of the castle at Stobs in 1712. The clan society usually accepts that the name originated from the town and river Elliot in Angus, Scotland. More likely sources claim that the Scottish surnames (Eliott, Elliot) originate from the Ellot Scottish border-clan, from a transformation of the name Elwold. It is known that Ellot of Redheugh was living in the early 1400s. In 1426 John Elwalde of Teviotdale is recorded. In 1476, Robert Ellot of Redheugh appears as the tenth chief of the clan. Whatever their true origin, the Scottish Elliotts became notorious border reivers – cattle thieves – in the Scottish-English border area and a thorn in the side of both governments.

The Scottish name origin is discussed by Keith Elliot Hunter on the Elliot Clan website where he argues for a Breton origin to the name and the first chief being William d'Alyth. Under that name, the d'Alyths played a key role in the Scottish Wars of Independence. However, Mark Elliot presents a well-argued case that there is no connection between the Elliot river and town with the clan and believes the origins are in the first name of Elwald, which appears in Northumberland in the eighth-century king, Elwald I. The name has Anglo-Saxon origins and appears alongside Armstrong in Northumbrian records dating from 1165. The first chief is claimed to be Robert Elwold (1305–67), who came from York, but migrated to the area around Hermitage Castle Robert Elwold of Redheuch is granted lands around Redheuch and Larriston in the 1484 Sasine deed Robert, 13th clan chief, who was killed at the Battle of Flodden is recorded with the surname 'Elwold'.

The original Anglo-Saxon surnames from Northumbria like Aelwold, Ellwald, Elaund, Elwaird, Elwods, Alwods, Elyards, Halwads seem to have mixed together eventually as Ellot. Sir Arthur and the Dowager Lady Eliott maintained that the family were originally known as Ellots. Lady Elliot in The Elliots: The Story of a Border Clan says: "Around 1650 someone added an 'I' to our name to make it Elliot, which was without a doubt unfortunate as it confuses the clan with a well-known English Norman family called Eliot who settled in West England". That would exclude the idea that the Cornish Eliots set the clan up a few centuries earlier, but it is said that this was some means of expressing solidarity with John Eliot, who was regularly imprisoned by Charles I until his death in 1632.

A Thomas Elyot is recorded in West Lothian, dying in 1505.

=== France ===
It has been argued by Keith Elliott Hunter that the origins of the St. Germans Eliot family were among the Bretons accompanying William the Conqueror. The Breton origin of Eliot and Elliot is indicated by these names being in significant clusters in Morbihan, southern Brittany. One variant in Scotland was Dalliot (or, more likely, d'Alliot) and a variation from the Breton original name Ellegouet, from which the Scots variant Elligott is derived, is to be found in clusters in Finistère. Elot is also a Breton name variant.

The name Eliot appears in Normandy in 1195 and a son of Anschar Elyot in 1198. Large surviving clusters of Eliots in Seine Maritime (Normandy). today could be due to later grants of land. The Alliots, found in southern Brittany and the Loire-Atlantique, also had lands in Aisne, north-east of Paris.

=== England ===
Soon after victory at the Battle of Hastings Elliots spread out all across England.

==== Southwest England and South Wales ====
Eliot family of St. Germans coat of arms

In 1069, the Breton Count Brien (Brian of Brittany) of Penthievre (on the Quiberon peninsula in the Departement of Morbihan), a member of the Counts and dukes of Penthièvre, who was despatched to the West Country to deal with Anglo-Saxon rebels and included Elliots among his troops. It is unknown exactly when the Eliots settled in Devon, but it is estimated they prospered there for 8 to 10 generations before moving to Cornwall, where they are thought to be the origin of the Eliot family of Cornwall at Port Eliot/St. Germans. The family claims descent from a Norman knight, Sir William de Aliot. The earliest record is of a William Elyot, who appears in the Somerset Assizes rolls in 1257 and Walter Elyot in Devon in 1433.

Other Eliots were sent later to Monmouthshire in South Wales

==== Northern England ====
It is possible that Elliots were among the Bretons, who settled in Yorkshire as vassals of the 12th century Earl of Richmond, Alan of Penthièvre, also a member of the family of the Counts and dukes of Penthièvre

==== East England ====
It appears that another part of the family went to Cambridgeshire. The first record of the name relates to Henry Elyot at the Priory of St Mary and St. Radegund in Cambridge in about 1180. An Elyat (or Elyot) is in Bury St. Edmunds in 1188. By 1220, Elyot is well-established in Cambridge in Great St Andrew's Parish where a William Elyot is listed. Another William Eliot appears in about 1270 in the same parish. Elyot ad Cap' Ville is listed in Cambridgeshire in 1273.)

The surname spreads into East Anglia by the early 14th century. Thomas Elyott is recorded as the rector of Dickleburgh, Norfolk, in 1393.

The first reference to the surname in Essex is RICHARDI Elyotte in 1433, who may be the RYC Elyett, who signed an indenture in about 1400.

The first record of the surname reaching London is early in the 14th century. Johanne Eliot appears in the 1319 Portsoken (near Aldgate) Subsidy Roll of 1319 with a reference to him being found in 1311 under John Elyot. In the Museum of London is "a bronze jug with three feet and three bands of lettering around the neck and body. The neck is straight with a pointed spout. The body is fat and bulbous. Dated c.1400, this fine bronze jug is inscribed: "+THOMAS:E[L]YOT/ +HI RECOMAND ME TO EU/ +WYLLEAM:ELYOT" ".

William Elyot of Cheshunt (north of London) received land at Kingston upon Thames (south-west London) in 1343: Grant by John, son of John Donnyng of Kyngeston, to William Elyot, of Chestehunte, of a grange and land in Kyngeston. Thursday, the feast of St. Edmund the King. 17 Edward III."

==== Southern England ====
Possibly from a later family arriving from northern France, the surname first appears in Sussex in the 14th century as Godefro Elyot at Thakham and William Elyot in Grinstead are listed in the Subsidy Rolls of 1327 & 1332. A Stephen Elyot is recorded in September 1364 as a "vintner of Rye" in east Sussex and later became its MP in 1377.

William Elyot was Constable of Horsham in 1401 and his grandson, Thomas Elyot (1420–1467), a filacer (issuer of the Royal Writs), is buried at Wonersh church in Surrey, not far north of Horsham. It is from him that the Elliots of Godalming descend, with their arms being Azure with a fess or (blue with a gold strip across the centre). The Surrey Elyots changed to Eliott in about 1500 and then changed to Elliott during the 1700s (see Elliott v Davenport 1705, a legal case concerning wills, brought by the main family) and settled on it by the end of the 18th century.

It is not made easier by a member of the clan Eliott Stobs branch of the family, George Augustus Eliott, (1717–1790), the defender of Gibraltar, being made 1st Baron Heathfield, which is in Sussex, although he died childless.

=== Northern Ireland ===
Robert Bell in The Book of Scots-Irish Family Names adds: "For double L and double T, / the Scots should look across the sea!" He pointed out that 71 of 76 births of children by that name in Ireland in 1890 spelt it "Elliott". Elliot(t)s emigrated or were sent to north Ireland in the early 17th century after the Border area was pacified, following the union of the English and Scottish crowns in 1603. Many settled in county Fermanagh.

=== Portugal ===
An English Eliot family came to Portugal led by Gilbert Eliot, who accompanied the then 1st Earl of Cambridge to aid King Ferdinand I of Portugal during the Fernandine Wars, during the Third Fernandine War of 1381 and 1382. He married Guterres Fernandes, daughter of the nobleman Fernão Guterres Telo, Castilian, one of the twenty-eight, who were expelled from Portugal in compliance with the Peace of Santarém of 24 March 1373, between Portuguese King Ferdinand I and Henry II. Gilbert Eliot established himself at Pernes in Santarém, Portugal, and aged 28 years old, joined the army of King John I of Portugal, whom he accompanied in the Portuguese conquest of Ceuta on 21 August 1415, where he remained and served with a good reputation. He married Teresa de Vasconcelos, daughter of Joane Mendes de Vasconcelos, Lord of Alvarenga and of the Land of Parada< Their son, Octávio Eliot, was the father of Fernão Liote. Gilbert Eliot's great-great-great-great-grandson, Francisco Liote, Knight of the Order of Christ, was appointed Nobleman of the Royal Household, General of the Province of the Alentejo and Great Captain by King Philip III of Portugal. This not only gave Francisco Liote the rank of a nobleman, but for his service at Tangier, he was granted new arms by a Letter of 22 July 1638. These arms refer to is killing a lion that had attacked him at the city. Francisco Liote married Isabel Álvares Banha, of whom he left children continuing this variation of the Elliot surname, usually written as Leote, although it changed over time to the English form of Liote. The Liote name went from Pernes to Tangier and later returned to the Iberian Peninsula, settling at the province of Algarve, Kingdom of the Algarve. The arms granted to Francisco Liote are: vert, an armed arm argent, moving from the left flank and with the hand carnation, holding by the ear a lion's head or, torn off and bloody. Crest: the arm and the head of the shield. The family also used the forms Liotte and Leotte.

=== DNA ===
The Elliot Clan Society has an extensive list of DNA results which point to native Celtic origins for the clan. However, the three contributions from Sussex suggest both a native origin in the area and the unusual J haplotype from southern Europe. There are also suggestions of French and Breton DNA from the Surrey Elliotts.

== Surname myths ==
Some sources claim it may be derived from a French form of Elias, which is itself derived from the biblical name "Elijah".

It is claimed that the surname originated in the early 13th century as "Eliot", as there is supposed to be a reference to "Geoffrey Eliot", Abbot of Hyde, in documents linked to the creation of Magna Carta. However, the Abbot of Hyde Abbey (near Winchester in Hampshire), who signed the 1224 version was Abbot Aston and the 1297 version confirmed by Edward I mentions the Abbot of Hyde as a witness, but does not name him.

There are also records in the Domesday Book of the name spelled "Ailiet", thought to originate from an Old English name "Æþelgeat" (meaning "noble gate") and leading to the English and Scottish given name spelled "Elyat".

== Notable bearers of the surname ==
Among the many famous people with this name are the authors T. S. Eliot and George Eliot (pseudonym of Mary Ann Evans).

=== Eliot ===
- Eliot (surname)
- Lord Eliot or Baron Eliot, a title of the Earl of St Germans
- Eliot family (America), influential family in the United States

=== Elliott ===
- Elliott (surname)

=== Eliott ===
- Eliott (surname)
- Lord Eliott, a title of the Eliott baronets Baronets of Stobs

=== Elliot ===
- Elliot (surname)

=== Elyot ===
- Kevin Elyot (1951–2014), British playwright, screenwriter and actor
- Thomas Elyot (1490–1546), British diplomat and scholar

== Given name ==
=== Eliot ===
- Eliot Bliss (1903–1990), Jamaican-born English novelist and poet
- Eliot A. Cohen (born 1956), American political scientist
- Eliot Engel, US Representative for New York's 16th congressional district
- Eliot Ness (1903–1957), American prohibition agent
- Eliot Salt, English actress, theatre maker, and writer
- Eliot Spitzer, American politician
- Eliot Sumner (born 1990), English singer, songwriter and actor
- Eliot Teltscher (born 1959), American professional tennis player
- Eliot Vassamillet (born 2000), represented Belgium at the Eurovision Song Contest 2019

=== Eliott ===
- Eliott Crestan (born 1999), Belgian runner
- Eliott Mounoud (born 1995), Swiss beach soccer player
- Eliott Pierre (born 2001), French para-cyclist
- Eliott Rodriguez (born 1956), Cuban-American television journalist
- Eliott Roudil (born 1996), France rugby union player
- Eliott Sorin (born 1993), French footballer

=== Elliot ===
- Elliot Abravanel, American physician and diet counselor
- Elliot Anderson, English footballer
- Elliot Anderson (politician), American politician and a Democratic member of the Nevada Assembly
- Elliot Aronson, American psychologist
- Elliot Balchin, actor in various British television series
- Elliot Benchetrit, French tennis player
- Elliot Benyon, English footballer
- Elliot Bigelow, American right fielder in Major League Baseball
- Elliot Brown, several people
  - Elliot Brown (actor), English actor
  - Elliott R. Brown, American physicist
  - Elliott Browne (cricketer), English cricketer
  - Elliott Browne (gymnast), British gymnast
- Elliot Bunney, Scottish athlete
- Elliot Cadeau (born 2004), American-Swedish basketball player
- Elliot Caplin (1913–2000), American comic strip writer
- Elliot Chorley, Canadian ice hockey right winger
- Elliot E. Cohen (1899–1959), American founder-editor of Commentary Magazine
- Elliot Cowan, English actor
- Elliot Daly, English rugby union footballer
- Elliot Davis (composer), British composer, musician and music documentary maker
- Elliot Davis (cinematographer) (born 1948), American cinematographer
- Elliot Dee, Welsh rugby union player
- Elliot Desmond, Nigerian Actor and Politician
- Elliot del Borgo (1938–2013), American composer for winds and strings
- Elliot Dixon, New Zealand rugby union player
- Elliot N. Dorff, American rabbi
- Elliot Easton, American, lead guitarist for The Cars
- Elliot Eisner, American educational theorist and art educator
- Elliot Evans, English teen pop singer
- Elliot Glen (born 1998), Scottish drag performer
- Elliot Fletcher, American actor and musician
- Elliot Gleave, British singer/rapper
- Elliot Goldenthal, American composer
- Elliot Handler (1916–2011), American inventor and business magnate
- Elliot Kaczynski (born 2010), Swedish racing driver
- Elliot Lee, English footballer
- Elliot Levine (born 1963), American jazz keyboardist
- Elliot Martin (1924–2017), American theatre producer
- Elliot McAdam (1951–2024), Australian politician
- Elliot Page, Canadian actor and producer
- Elliot Richardson, American politician
- Elliot Rodger, English-American mass murderer who perpetrated the 2014 Isla Vista killings
- Elliot Ellie Salkow (1953–2021), South African entrepreneur
- Elliot See (1927–1966), American astronaut
- Elliot Simmons (born 1998), English footballer
- Elliot Smith (American football) (born 1967), American football player
- Elliot Steinmetz (born 1980), American basketball coach
- Elliot Túpac, Peruvian muralist and lettering artist
- Elliot Washington II (born 2003), American football player
- Elliot Welles (1927–2006), directed the B'nai B'rith Anti-Defamation League's task force on Nazi war criminals

=== Elliott ===
- Elliott Abrams, American politician
- Elliott Arkin, American artist
- Elliott Arnold, American writer
- Elliott Avent, American baseball coach
- Elliott Belgrave (born 1931), Barbadian lawyer and High Court Judge, governor-general of Barbados 2012–2017
- Elliott Bennett, English footballer
- Elliott Broidy, American businessman
- Elliott Carter, American composer
- Elliott Chaze, American writer
- Elliott J. Clawson (1883–1942), American screenwriter
- Elliott Colla, American scholar of the Middle East
- Elliott C. Cowdin, American military pilot
- Elliott Cutler, American surgeon
- Elliott Daingerfield (1859–1932), American artist
- Elliott Dexter, American actor
- Elliott Earls, American graphic designer and artist
- Elliott Erwitt (1928–2023), French-American advertising and documentary photographer
- Elliott Ferrous-Martin Platt (born 2004), known as ElyOtto, Canadian musician
- Elliott Fry (born 1994), American football player
- Elliott Galkin, American musician
- Elliott Gould, American actor
- Elliott Himmelberg, Australian rules footballer
- Elliott Holt, American writer
- Elliott Hundley (born 1975), American artist
- Elliott Jaques, Canadian social scientist
- Elliott Johnston, Australian jurist
- Elliott Jordan, English actor
- Elliott P. Joslin, American doctor
- Elliott Kalan, American comedian
- Elliott Kastner, American film producer
- Elliott D. Kieff, American physician
- Elliott Kline American neo-Nazi
- Elliott Lester, British film director
- Elliott Lewis, several people
  - Elliott Lewis (actor), American actor
  - Elliott Lewis (politician), Australian politician
  - Eliot Lewis, American singer and musician
- Elliott H. Lieb, American mathematical physicist
- Elliott List, English footballer
- Elliott Maddox (born 1947), American major league baseball player
- Elliott Ellie Mannette (1927–2018), Trinidadian musical instrument maker
- Elliott Mason (1888–1949), British actress
- Elliott Miles McKinley (born 1969), American composer
- Elliott Mendelson, American logician
- Elliott Waters Montroll (1916–1983), American scientist and mathematician
- Elliott Moore, English footballer
- Elliott Morgan, American YouTuber and stand-up comedian
- Elliott Morris, several people
  - Elliott Morris (footballer), Northern Irish footballer
  - Elliott Morris (rugby league), English rugby league player
  - G. Elliott Morris, American data journalist
  - Elliott Morris Devred, Welsh squash player
  - Elliott Morris (musician), English musician
  - Eliot Morris, American musician
- Elliott Murphy (born 1949), American singer-songwriter and novelist
- Elliott Norris, American farmer and politician
- Elliott Nugent, American actor
- Elliott Oring, American academic author
- Elliott Ormsbee, American footballer
- Elliott Portnoy, American attorney
- Elliott Power, English musician
- Elliott Pritt, American politician
- Elliott Puckett (born 1993), American drag performer
- Elliott Randall, American guitarist
- Elliott Reid, American actor
- Elliott Roosevelt, two people
  - Elliott Roosevelt (general)
  - Elliott Roosevelt (socialite)
- Elliott Sadler, American racing driver
- Elliott Sclar, American architect
- Elliott Sharp, American composer and musician
- Elliott Fitch Shepard, American lawyer
- Elliott Smith (1969–2003), American singer-songwriter
- Elliott F. Smith, American politician
- Elliott Sober, American professor
- Elliott B. Strauss, American rear admiral
- Elliott Tittensor, British actor
- Elliott Ward, English footballer
- Elliott Whitehead, British rugby league player
- Elliott West, American historian
- Elliott Whitehouse (born 1993), English footballer
- Elliott Wilson, several people
  - Elliott Wilson (cricketer), (1976-) English former cricketer
  - Elliott Wilson (journalist), American journalist
  - Elliot Wilson, (1979-) English cricketer
- Elliott Woolfolk Major, American lawyer and politician
- Elliott Wright, British reality television personality
- Elliott Yamin, American singer and American Idol participant

=== Elliotte ===
- Elliotte Friedman (born 1970), Canadian sports journalist
- Elliotte Rusty Harold (born 1960), American computer scientist, lecturer and author

== Fictional characters ==
- Eliot, a character in the Dead or Alive video game series
- Eliot Rosewater, in the Kurt Vonnegut novel, God Bless You, Mr. Rosewater
- Elliot Alderson, the main lead character in the thriller television series Mr. Robot
- Elliot Moose, protagonist of the series of the same name
- Elliot Reid, female character in the comedy-drama series Scrubs
- Elliot Stabler, senior detective from Law & Order: Special Victims Unit and Law & Order: Organized Crime portrayed by Christopher Meloni
- Elliott, the lead character in the British animated television series Elliott from Earth
- Elliott Gilbert, a character in the American television series Glee
- Elliott Schwartz, a character played by Adam Godley in the American television series Breaking Bad
- Elliott Taylor, male main character in the Steven Spielberg film E.T. the Extra-Terrestrial and its short sequel A Holiday Reunion

== See also ==
- Little Jock Elliot, Scottish border ballad
