= 1898 New York gubernatorial election =

- November 8, 1898
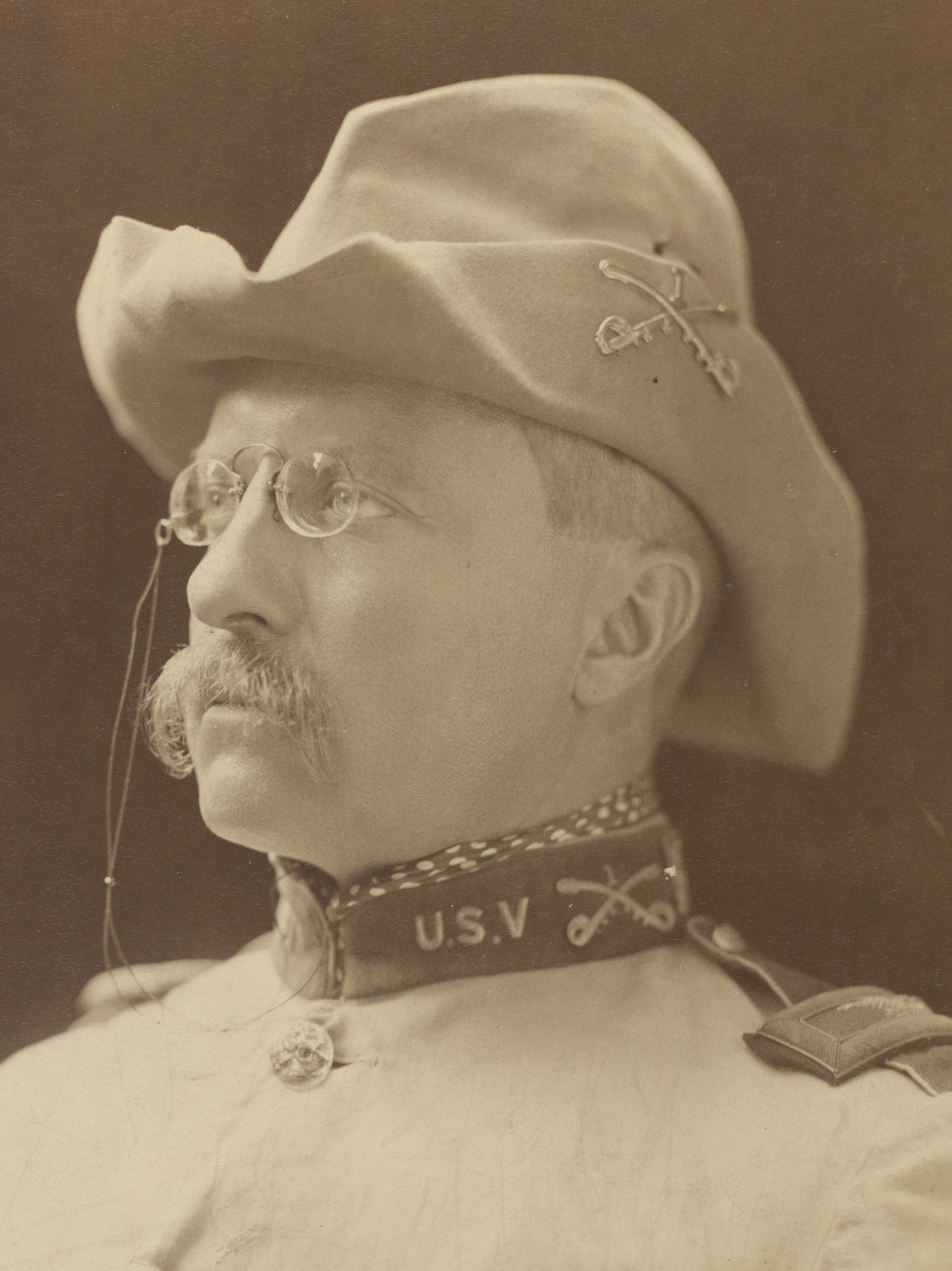

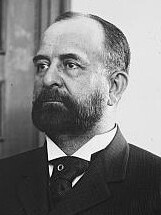
| Nominee | Theodore Roosevelt | Augustus Van Wyck |
| Party | Republican | Democratic |
| Popular vote | 661,707 | 643,921 |
| Percentage | 49.02% | 47.70% |
- County results Roosevelt: 40–50% 50–60% 60–70% Van Wyck: 40–50% 50–60%
Governor before election
Frank S. Black
Republican
Elected Governor
Theodore Roosevelt
Republican

The 1898 New York gubernatorial election was held on November 8, 1898. Republican incumbent Frank S. Black was defeated for re-nomination by Theodore Roosevelt, the former United States assistant secretary of the Navy and a returning hero of the Spanish–American War. In the general election, Roosevelt defeated judge Augustus Van Wyck.

Roosevelt outmaneuvered party bosses, particularly U.S. senator Thomas C. Platt, by leveraging his personal popularity and a threat to run as an independent reform candidate. After cornering the bosses, he secured the Republican nomination over incumbent Frank S. Black at the state convention.

As governor, Roosevelt pursued progressive reforms and continued to present an obstacle to boss rule. To remove him from Albany, Platt maneuvered to have Roosevelt nominated as President William McKinley's running mate in 1900, against the governor's wishes. He was elected and became president on September 14, 1901 after McKinley was assassinated.

== Republican and Citizens Union nominations ==
=== Candidates ===
- Frank S. Black, incumbent governor since 1895
- Theodore Roosevelt, former United States Assistant Secretary of the Navy and New York City Police Commissioner

=== Campaign ===
Returning from Cuba as a war hero, Theodore Roosevelt had popular approval but lacked support from the state's Republican political machine, which he had opposed as a member of the State Assembly and Police Commissioner. Instead of directly approaching Republican bosses Thomas C. Platt and Benjamin Odell, Roosevelt first approached the Citizens Union, a good government organization, and suggested the nomination of an independent good-government ticket. The executive committee of the Citizens Union endorsed the Roosevelt plan with only three dissenting votes. As a result, an "Independent Citizens' Committee" was formed, and six thousand signatures were gathered on a petition for ballot access, with most signers believing that Roosevelt headed the ticket and that the Citizens Union backed it.

Facing the uncertain prospect of a three-cornered election against Roosevelt and the rival Democratic Party, the bosses instead offered Roosevelt the Republican nomination against the wishes of incumbent Frank S. Black. On September 24, three days ahead of the Republican state convention, Roosevelt suddenly declined to run on the independent ticket.

=== Results ===
The state convention met on September 27 at Saratoga Springs with Sereno E. Payne serving as temporary chairman. Horace White was elected as permanent chairman, and Roosevelt was nominated for governor on the first ballot.

1898 New York Republican convention
| Party | Candidate | Votes | % |
|---|---|---|---|
| Republican | Theodore Roosevelt | 753 | 77.55% |
| Republican | Frank S. Black (incumbent) | 218 | 22.45% |
| Total votes | | 971 | 100.00% |

=== Aftermath ===
On September 30, Robert Fulton Cutting and a majority of the Citizens Union executive committee rejected the idea of an independent state ticket (with or without Roosevelt) as "not only inconsistent with, but actually opposed to the fundamental principles and objects of" the Citizens Union. However, the Independent Citizens' Committee declared the next day that they would proceed with nominations, and their petition was filed with the office of the secretary of state on October 12. Roosevelt immediately sent a letter to the secretary declining to run on the independent ticket, which would have threatened Republican candidates for lower offices. As a result of Roosevelt's decision, the Independent Citizens' Committee substituted Theodore Bacon, a Rochester lawyer, as their nominee. Cutting, despite his earlier rejection of the state ticket idea per se, ultimately campaigned for the Bacon ticket.

== Democratic nomination ==
=== Candidates ===
- James Kennedy McGuire, mayor of Syracuse
- John B. Stanchfield, New York City attorney, former assemblyman, and former mayor of Elmira
- Robert C. Titus, judge of the New York Supreme Court and former state senator from Buffalo
- Augustus Van Wyck, judge of the New York Supreme Court from Brooklyn and brother of New York City mayor Robert A. Van Wyck

=== Results ===
The Democratic ticket was a compromise between the three most powerful Democratic bosses: David B. Hill from upstate, Richard Croker of Tammany Hall in Manhattan, and Hugh McLaughlin of Brooklyn. The Democratic convention met on September 28 and 29 at Syracuse. Brooklyn judge Augustus Van Wyck, the brother of New York City mayor Robert A. Van Wyck, was nominated on the first ballot.

1898 New York Democratic convention
| Party | Candidate | Votes | % |
|---|---|---|---|
| Democratic | Augustus Van Wyck | 351 | 78.00% |
| Democratic | John B. Stanchfield | 41 | 9.11% |
| Democratic | Robert C. Titus | 39 | 8.67% |
| Democratic | James Kennedy McGuire | 19 | 4.22% |
| Total votes | | 450 | 100.00% |

=== Aftermath ===
On September 30, one day after the Democratic convention, the National Democratic Party state committee met at 52 William Street in New York City. The committee resolved not to call a convention or endorse any candidates.

== General election ==
=== Candidates ===
- Theodore Bacon, Rochester attorney (Independent Citizens)
- Ben Hanford, printer and labor organizer (Socialist Labor)
- John Kline, Keuka College professor (Prohibition)
- Theodore Roosevelt, former United States Assistant Secretary of the Navy and New York City Police Commissioner (Republican)
- Augustus Van Wyck, judge of the New York Supreme Court from Brooklyn brother of Mayor of New York City Robert A. Van Wyck (Democratic)

=== Results ===
1898 New York gubernatorial election
| Party | Candidate | Votes | % |
|---|---|---|---|
| Republican | Theodore Roosevelt | 661,707 | 49.02% |
| Democratic | Augustus Van Wyck | 643,921 | 47.70% |
| Socialist Labor | Benjamin Hanford | 23,860 | 1.77% |
| Prohibition | John Kline | 18,383 | 1.36% |
| Independent | Theodore Bacon | 2,103 | 0.16% |
| Total votes | | 1,349,974 | 100.00% |

== See also ==
- New York gubernatorial elections

== Sources ==
- How to vote split tickets: HOW TO MARK THE BALLOT in NYT on October 31, 1898
- The Democratic nominees: THE DEMOCRATIC TICKET.; Sketches of the Men Nominated for Office by the Syracuse Convention in NYT on September 30, 1898
- Result in New York County: OFFICIAL ELECTION FIGURES.; Vote Cast in New York County... in NYT on December 24, 1898
- Result in Kings County: ...The Official Vote in Kings in NYt on December 4, 1898
