= Elliot Brown (actor) =

British actor

Elliot Brown (born Elliot James Brown, 12 December 1991) is an actor from Welwyn, Hertfordshire, England.

== Biography ==
Brown was born in Welwyn Garden City, Hertfordshire. Son of, Peter and Allison, he grew up with his sister Lydia and brother Myles in Welwyn, Hertfordshire. His Mother was once a singer with the band, Opus One whilst his Father is a freelance Dubbing Mixer. Brown is a nephew of actress and TV presenter, Finola Hughes who originated the role of Victoria the White Cat in Andrew Lloyd Webber's musical, Cats.

Brown went to St Mary's Primary School before attending Monk's Walk School; also attended by singer and presenter, Alesha Dixon and golfer, Tom Lewis.

In 2011, Brown got a scholarship for the acting course at Mountview Academy of Theatre Arts, in North London.

== Career ==
Brown made his professional début in October 2010 appearing as Gallarius in Alban the Opera composed by Tom Wiggall and libretto by John Mole at St Alban the Martyr Church, Holborn, London directed by Beckie Mills.

In March 2012 Brown workshopped, In 20 Years Time, When He Sees This... a new-play by BAFTA & EMMY award-winning writer, Richard Vincent with former Sheffield Crucible & Salisbury Playhouse artistic director, Deborah Paige.

== The Barn Theatre presents... ==
In June 2011, Brown created the series The Barn Theatre presents... to raise money for The Barn Theatre's Studio Project. 2011 Olivier Award winning actor, Adrian Scarborough was Brown's first guest on 19 June 2011 whilst on 24 July 2011, Alesha Dixon joined Brown.

== The Bush Theatre ==
In October 2010, Brown joined The Bush Theatre, Shepherd's Bush, London as a Young Producer for Josie Rourke's last schools season working on the outreach-programme What Do You Want?. The season consisted of two school-themed plays, The Knowledge by John Donnelly and Little Platoons by Steve Waters starring Joanne Froggatt.

== Tourettes: I Swear I Can Sing ==
Brown appeared on a BBC Documentary, Tourettes: I Swear I Can Sing which followed the life of Ruth Ojadi who has Tourette syndrome (TS) Brown attended a Tourettes Action meeting to talk to individuals with TS whilst preparing for a role at Mountview Academy of Theatre Arts with Richard Vincent. The documentary aired on BBC Three on 12 December 2011
