= Elliott Morris =

Elliott Morris may refer to:

- Elliott Morris (footballer) (born 1981), Northern Irish footballer
- Elliott Morris (rugby league) (born 1996), English rugby league footballer
- G. Elliott Morris (born 1996), American data journalist
- Elliott Morris Devred (born 1998), Welsh squash player
- Elliott Morris (musician), English singer-songwriter and guitarist

== See also ==
- Eliot Morris (born 1977), American singer-songwriter and musician
- Elliott B. Norris (1845–1918), American farmer and politician
