= Elliot Brown =

El(l)iot(t) Brown(e) may refer to:

- Elliot Brown (actor) (born 1991), English actor
- Elliott Brown (gridiron football) (born 1998), American football player
- Elliott Browne (cricketer) (1847–1915), English cricketer
- Elliott Browne (gymnast) (born 1997), British trampoline gymnast
- Elliott R. Brown, American physicist
- Elliott Jerome Brown Jr. (born 1993), queer black American artist and photographer
