= Paul Sheehan =

Paul Sheehan may refer to:

- Paul Sheehan (golfer) (born 1977), Australian golfer
- Paul Sheehan (journalist) (born 1951), Australian journalist
- Paul Sheehan (singer), British baritone in Alban (opera)

== See also ==
- Paul Sheahan (born 1946), cricketer
