= Edward Sutton Smalley =

Edward Sutton Smalley was born about 1589 in Bideford, Devon. He moved to Maine about 1632 with his son Francis. With others, founded Piscataqua, which was afterwards divided into the towns of Kittery, Eliot, South Berwich and Berwick. He was on a grand jury in 1640 in Saco and a magistrate in Falmouth, Maine in 1645 and later went to the Isle of Shoals. Although he built a house in Piscataqua, before 1643, as a grant of one hundred acres made to him by Thomas Gorges, the deputy governor of the Province of Maine. He died in 1665.
