= Beth Anderson (composer) =

American neo-romantic composer

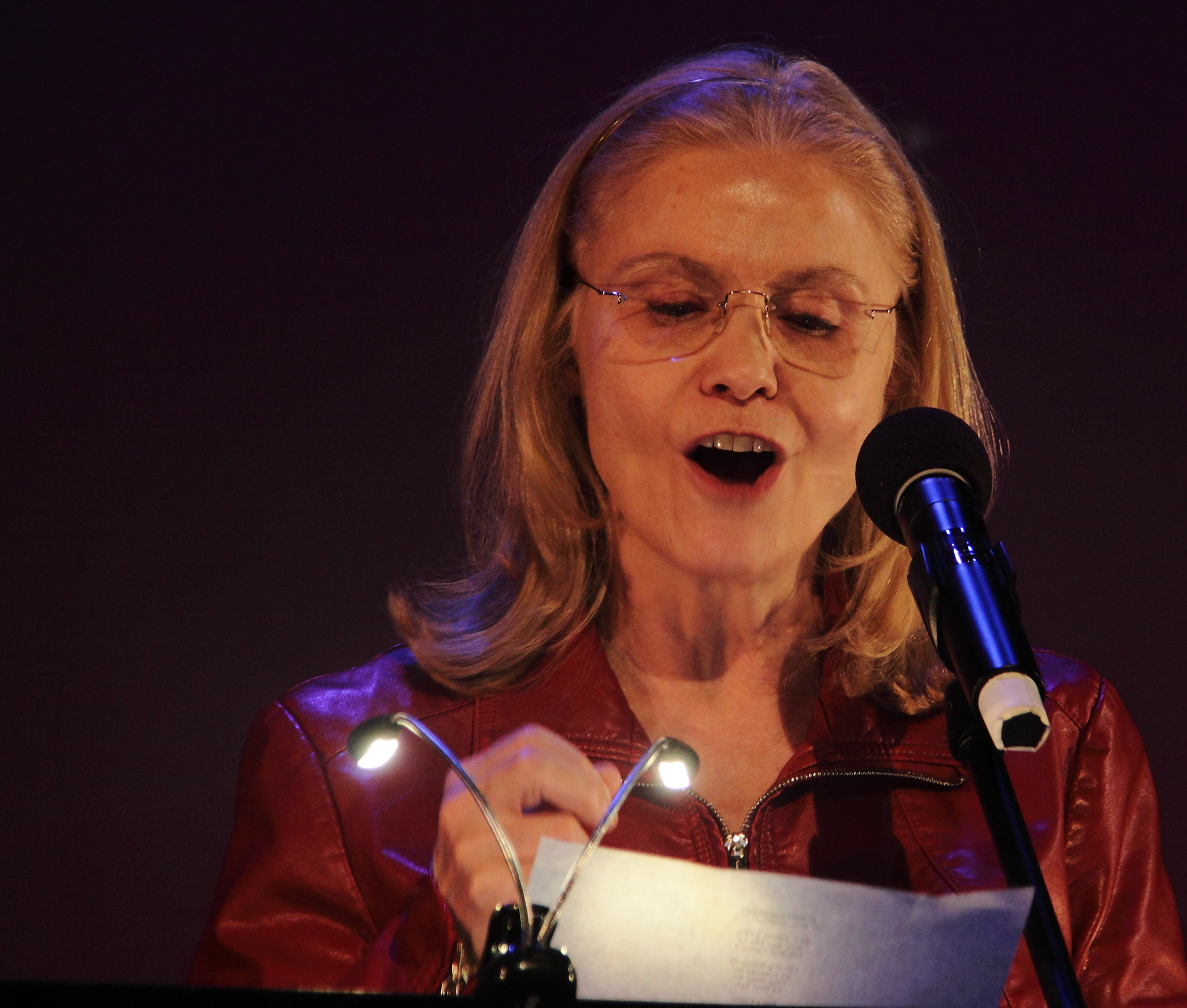
Beth Anderson performing at Other Minds 23 in San Francisco

Beth Anderson is an American neo-romantic composer.

Anderson is best known in her field for her swales, a musical form she invented based on collages and samples of newly composed music rather than existing music. She told a reporter for The New York Times in 1995 she named the form based on this definition of the word: "A swale is a meadow or marsh where a lot of wild things go together."

== Biography ==
=== Early life and education ===
Anderson was born in Lexington, Kentucky in 1950 and grew up in Mt. Sterling, Kentucky. Her parents, Marjorie and Sidney Anderson, encouraged her to pursue music. She began playing the piano as a child and began composing shortly after. At age 14 she began studying piano with composer Helen Libscomb. Liscomb taught Anderson the rules of counterpoint, enabling her to compose simplistic traditional music. During her last two years of high school she began to compose serial music, learning from books on the topic.

Anderson attended the University of Kentucky after graduating from high school. After two years there she transferred to the University of California, Davis. After completing her undergraduate degree she received her Master of Fine Arts Degree in Piano Performance. Shortly before completing that degree, her piece Peachy Keen-O was performed at Mills College. Bob Ashley, director of the Mills College Center for Contemporary Music, upon hearing the performance, urged her to stay there and study. She completed her M.A. in Composition there.

=== Later life ===
In California, Anderson became known as one of the prominent "avant-garde feminist composers, critics, and poets." She married the computer book author Elliotte Rusty Harold on July 28, 1995, one year after they met at a potluck dinner held by the New York Macintosh Users Group. A 1995 The New York Times feature story on Harold's wedding called her both old-fashioned and conventional and observed, "She giggles often, as lightly as wind chimes. And yet she listens to the band Megadeth when cleaning her apartment."

== Discography ==
- Feminae in Musica (Feminae Records, 2007)
  - Tale One
  - Tale Three
  - Belgian Tango
    - Performed by: Aleksandra Maslovaric (violin), Tania Fleischer (piano)
- Namely (Other Minds Records, 2020)

== Listening ==
- NewMusicJukeBox.org: Beth Anderson
