= Scene from Faust =

Scene from Faust (usually understood as Goethe's Faust) may refer to:

- Scene from Faust (Pushkin) (Russian: Сцена из Фауста) — work of Alexander Pushkin
- Scene from Faust (Schubert) (German: Szene aus ‘Faust’) — composition by Franz Schubert
- Scenes from Goethe's Faust (German: Szenen aus Goethes Faust) – composition by Robert Schumann
