= 1898 New York state election =

- November 8, 1898

The 1898 New York state election was held on November 8, 1898, to elect the governor, the lieutenant governor, the Secretary of State, the state comptroller, the attorney general, the state treasurer and the state engineer, as well as all members of the New York State Assembly and the New York State Senate. This election is the most recent election to feature a candidate for governor of New York who eventually became both Vice President of the United States and President of the United States after serving as Governor of New York.

== History ==
The Prohibition state convention met on June 30 at Syracuse, New York, and nominated Prof John Kline, of Penn Yan, for governor, Rev. John A. Sayles, of East Aurora, for lieutenant governor; Henry Wilbur, editor of True Reform, of New York City, for secretary of state; Charles Mills, of Sodus, for comptroller; De Witt Hooker, of Syracuse, for treasurer; Francis Stephen M. Wing, of Canastota, for attorney general; and Albert W. Pierson, of Niagara Falls, for state engineer.

The Socialist Labor state convention met on August 27 at Rochester, New York, and nominated Benjamin Hanford for governor; Leander A. Armstrong, of Buffalo, for lieutenant governor; Philip Jackson, of Rochester, for secretary of state; Charles H. Corregan, for attorney general; Max Forker, of New York City, for comptroller; Joseph Smith, of Yonkers, for treasurer; and John H. Morris of Yonkers, for state engineer.

The Republican bosses Thomas C. Platt and Benjamin B. Odell Jr., were still busy to compose a ticket on September 25, but had already agreed upon Theodore Roosevelt to head it, against the wish of Governor Frank S. Black to be re-nominated. The state convention met on September 27 at Saratoga Springs, New York. Sereno E. Payne was Temporary Chairman until the choice of Horace White as Permanent Chairman. Theodore Roosevelt was nominated for governor on the first ballot (vote: Roosevelt 753, Black 218). The other candidates were nominated by acclamation with exception of John C. Davies for Attorney General who was nominated on the first ballot (vote: Davies 741, John M. Kellogg 229).

The Democratic state convention met on September 28 and 29 at Syracuse, New York. Frederick C. Schraub, the 1896 Lt. Gov. nominee, was Permanent Chairman. Augustus Van Wyck, the brother of the incumbent first Mayor of the consolidated City of New York, was nominated for governor on the first ballot (vote: Van Wyck 351, John B. Stanchfield 41, Robert C. Titus 39, James K. McGuire 19). The other candidates were nominated by acclamation. The ticket was a compromise between the three biggest Democratic bosses: David B. Hill from upstate, Richard Croker of Tammany, and Hugh McLaughlin of Brooklyn.

The National Democratic State Committee met on September 30 at 52, William Street, in New York City. Chairman Robert A. Weidenmann - the only man to speak out loud against Judge Isaac H. Maynard's nomination in 1893 - presided. They decided not to call a convention, and not to endorse any candidates.

Returning from Cuba as a war hero, Theodore Roosevelt used the Citizens Union in an astute scheme to get the Republican nomination, in spite of not being a machine Republican and having in mind to uproot the Republican "spoilsmen". He approached the Citizens Union and suggested the nomination of a state ticket what was endorsed by the Citizens' Union Executive Committee with only three dissenting votes. An "Independent Citizens Committee" was formed, and 6,000 signatures for a petition to file a ticket were gathered, the signers believing that Roosevelt headed the ticket and that the Citizens Union backed it.

To avoid being ousted from power in an uncertain three-cornered election, the Republican bosses offered Roosevelt the nomination, and suddenly on September 24, he declined to allow his name to be used on the independent ticket. On September 30, a majority of the Citizens Union Executive Committee, led by Chairman R. Fulton Cutting, rejected the idea of a state ticket as "not only inconsistent with, but actually opposed to the fundamental principles and objects of the Citizens' Union," The Independent Citizens Committee answered next day and declared that nominations will be made.

The petition to file the independent ticket was taken to the Secretary of State's office on October 12 purporting to represent nominations by the Citizens Union. The Secretary of State reserved his decision if the ticket would be filed or not. On this ticket were Theodore Roosevelt - already nominated by the Republicans state convention in September - for governor; Thomas M. Osborne for lieutenant governor; Oren E. Wilson, Mayor of Albany 1894–1895, for secretary of state; Thomas E. Kinney, Mayor of Utica, for comptroller; Edmund H. Titchener, of Binghamton, for treasurer; Frederick W. Hinrichs, the Gold Democrats nominee for lieutenant governor in 1896, for attorney general; and George E. Waring Jr., of New York City, for state engineer. Roosevelt immediately sent a letter of declination to the Secretary of State. Besides, Republican party officials protested against the petition. The Independent Citizens' Committee on Vacancies substituted Theodore Bacon, a lawyer of Rochester, on the ticket, and Citizens Union Chairman R. Fulton Cutting, despite his earlier rejection of the state ticket idea per se, campaigned for the ticket.

== Result ==
The whole Republican ticket was elected in a tight race.

The incumbent Woodruff was re-elected.

The Republican, Democratic, Prohibition and Socialist Labor parties maintained automatic ballot status (necessary 10,000).

1898 state election results
Office	Republican ticket		Democratic ticket		Socialist Labor ticket		Prohibition ticket		Independent Citizens' ticket	
Governor	Theodore Roosevelt	661,707	Augustus Van Wyck	643,921	Benjamin Hanford	23,860	John Kline	18,383	Theodore Bacon	2,103
Lieutenant Governor	Timothy L. Woodruff	653,879	Elliott Danforth	644,218	Leander A. Armstrong	24,601	John A. Sayles	19,879	Thomas M. Osborne	3,800
Secretary of State	John T. McDonough	656,000	George W. Batten	640,161	Philip Jackson	20,091	Henry Wilbur	20,538	Oren E. Wilson	2,932
Comptroller	William J. Morgan	653,862	Edward S. Atwater	642,898	Max Forker	24,912	Charles Mills	20,189	Thomas E. Kinney	2,900
Attorney General	John C. Davies	654,167	Thomas F. Conway	641,691	Charles H. Corregan	25,346	Stephen Mead Wing	20,116	Frederick W. Hinrichs	3,112
Treasurer	John P. Jaeckel	652,851	Elliott B. Norris	644,193	Joseph Smith	24,875	De Witt Hooker	20,261	Edmund H. Titchener	2,621
State Engineer	Edward A. Bond	653,114	Martin Schenck	643,432	John H. Morris	25,858	Albert W. Pierson	20,227	George E. Waring Jr.	2,231

== Sources ==
- How to vote split tickets: HOW TO MARK THE BALLOT in NYT on October 31, 1898
- The Democratic nominees: THE DEMOCRATIC TICKET.; Sketches of the Men Nominated for Office by the Syracuse Convention in NYT on September 30, 1898
- Result: NEW YORK'S OFFICIAL VOTE in NYT on December 30, 1898
- Result: The Tribune Almanac 1899
- Result in New York County: OFFICIAL ELECTION FIGURES.; Vote Cast in New York County... in NYT on December 24, 1898
- Result in Kings County: ...The Official Vote in Kings in NYt on December 4, 1898

== See also ==
New York gubernatorial elections
