= William F. Mackey =

American lawyer and politician (1858-1912)

William Fleming Mackey (January 3, 1858 – July 10, 1912) was an American lawyer and politician from New York.

== Life ==
Mackey was born on January 3, 1858, in Albion, New York. He moved to Middleport with his parents in 1869. He graduated from Lockport Union School in 1876.

Mackey initially studied law in the Lockport law firm Ellsworth, Potter & Brundage. He continued studying with Judge Brundage after the latter left the law firm. He was admitted to the bar in 1879, and initially continued working in the law office as managing clerk. When Brundage moved to Buffalo in 1883, Mackey practiced on his own in Lockport. In 1884, he moved to Buffalo as well. He practiced on his own for several years, but in 1890 he worked with John C. Draper Jr. under the law firm Mackey & Draper.

When he was 25, Mackey unsuccessfully ran for District Attorney of Niagara County as a Democrat. In the 1888 United States House of Representatives election, he was the Democratic candidate for New York's 32nd congressional district, but he lost to John M. Farquhar. Shortly after arriving in Buffalo, he helped form the Cleveland Democracy and served as its president in 1887, 1888, and 1892. In 1890, he was appointed an assistant city attorney. In 1893, he was elected assistant United States Attorney, a position he served as until 1897.

In 1898, Mackey was elected to the New York State Senate as a Democrat, representing the 47th District. He served in the Senate in 1899 and 1900. In the 1900 New York state election, he was the Democratic candidate for Lieutenant Governor of New York. He lost to Timothy L. Woodruff.

For several years, Mackey was associated with John C. Collins. In 1911, he moved to New York City and opened a law office there. He maintained a home in Lancaster from 1904 to his death.

In 1877, Mackey married Ella L. Robinson of Cambria. Their son was Dr. Clarence H. Mackey of Lancaster. He was a member of the Elks.

Mackey died from heat prostration at his apartment in the Bristol Hotel on July 10, 1912. He was buried in the Lancaster Rural Cemetery.

Party political offices
Preceded by Elliot Danforth	Democratic nominee for Lieutenant Governor of New York; 1900	Succeeded by Charles N. Bulger
New York State Senate
Preceded by Charles Lamy (New York politician)	New York State Senate; 47th District; 1899–1900	Succeeded by Henry W. Hill
