= Elliott Wilson =

Elliott Wilson may refer to:

- Elliott Wilson (cricketer) (born 1976), former English cricketer
- Elliott Wilson (journalist) (born 1971), American journalist, television producer and hip-hop magazine editor

== See also ==
- Elliot Wilson (born 1979), English cricketer
