= Tourettes Action =

British charity

Tourettes Action logo

Tourettes Action is a United Kingdom support and research charity for people with Tourette syndrome (TS) and their families. TS is a neurological condition characterised by tics—involuntary sounds and movements.

== History ==
The charity was founded as the Tourette Syndrome (UK) Association in 1980 by a small group of parents of children with TS, who came together for mutual support. In 2006, the charity relocated to London and substantially expanded its services. A windfall from Big Brother 2006 winner Pete Bennett gave the organisation the opportunity to plan for future development to reach a higher percentage of the 300,000 children and adults in the UK with TS. In June 2008 the charity adopted the name Tourettes Action, a new ID and website.

== Aims and services ==
According to their website, Tourettes Action's goal is to help individuals with TS receive the practical support and social acceptance they need to help them live their lives to the fullest. It also funds research into treatment and diagnosis of TS.

Tourettes Action's services include a Helpline, information packs, conferences and workshops, support groups, camps for teenagers, help finding specialists, networks among professionals, ID cards for people with a diagnosis of TS, free monthly email newsletters and an online forum.

Ruth Ojadi, organiser of the London Tourettes Action group, appeared in a BBC documentary titled Tourettes: I Swear I Can Sing, broadcast on BBC in December 2011. The documentary follows her over a number of months as she focuses on her ability to sing and her newfound confidence.
