= 1900 New York state election =

1900 New York gubernatorial election
- November 6, 1900
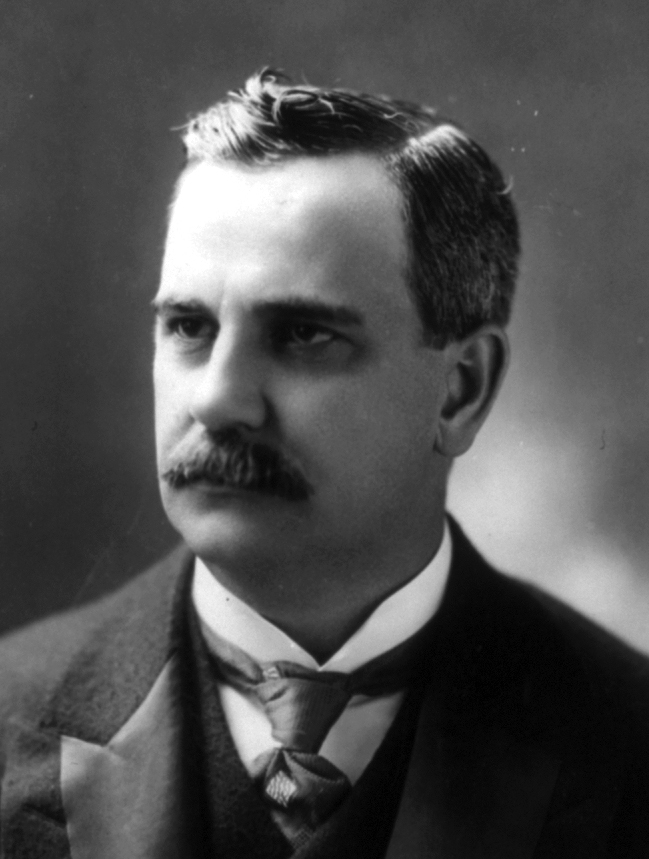

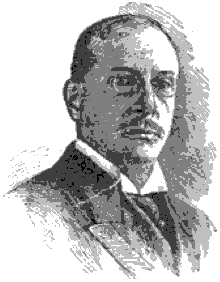
Nominee	Benjamin B. Odell Jr.	John B. Stanchfield
Party	Republican	Democratic
Popular vote	804,859	693,733
Percentage	51.98%	44.80%
- County results Odell: 40–50% 50–60% 60–70% 70–80% Stanchfield: 40–50% 50–60%
Governor before election
Theodore Roosevelt
Republican
Elected Governor
Benjamin B. Odell Jr.
Republican

The 1900 New York state election was held on November 6, 1900, to elect the governor, the lieutenant governor, the Secretary of State, the state comptroller, the attorney general, the state treasurer and the state engineer, as well as all members of the New York State Assembly and the New York State Senate.

== History ==
The Socialist Labor state convention met on June 8, 1900, at 6, Reade Street in Manhattan. Hugo Voght, of New York City, was chairman. They nominated Charles H. Corregan for governor; Leander A. Armstrong, of Buffalo, for lieutenant governor; Joseph H. Sweeney, of Westchester County, for Secretary of State; J. E. Alexander, of Albany, for treasurer; Eustis Ebert, of New York City, for attorney general; A. S. Brown, of New York City, for comptroller; and John E. Wallace, of Troy, for state engineer.

Delegates of the Socialist Democratic Party of New York and the seceding faction of the Socialist Labor Party met in state convention on June 16 at the Labor Lyceum in Brooklyn, and merged to form the Social Democratic Party of New York. V. S. Wirth, of Patchogue, was Temporary Chairman until the election of Morris Hillquit as Permanent Chairman. They nominated Benjamin Hanford for governor; William Butscher for lieutenant governor; Philip Jackson for Secretary of State; Eugene V. Brewster, of New York City, for attorney general; Frank Sieverman, of Rochester, for comptroller; Leonard D. Abbott, of New York City, for treasurer; and Henry Stahl, of New York City, for state engineer.

The Prohibition state convention met on July 24 at the Summit Park near Utica, New York. Henry W. Wilbur, the 1898 nominee for Secretary of State, was Temporary Chairman. They nominated William T. Wardwell, of New York City for governor; Albert J. Rumsey, of Batavia, for lieutenant governor; Joseph V. Baker, of Gouverneur, for Secretary of State; Mason N. Weed, of Montour Falls, for comptroller; Fred W. Hewitt, of Granville, for treasurer; Dexter D. Dorn, of Jamestown, for attorney general; and Emmett F. Smith, of Patchogue, for state engineer.

The Republican state convention met on September 4 and 5 at Saratoga Springs, New York. Nevada Stranahan was permanent chairman. Benjamin B. Odell, Jr., the Chairman of the Republican State Committee and chief lieutenant of boss Thomas C. Platt, was nominated for governor after his name was proposed by Ex-Governor Frank S. Black and a roll call in which all 971 votes were cast for the only candidate. Odell was chosen to succeed the incumbent Theodore Roosevelt who had been nominated earlier that year for U.S. Vice President during that years presidential election. All other incumbent state officers were re-nominated by acclamation. Comptroller Morgan died on the day the nominations were made. On September 13, the Republican State Committee met at the Fifth Avenue Hotel, and substituted Erastus C. Knight on the ticket.

The Democratic state convention met on September 11 and 12 at Saratoga Springs. Patrick H. McCarren was Temporary Chairman until the choice of George Raines as Permanent Chairman. John B. Stanchfield, Richard Croker's candidate, was nominated for governor on the first ballot defeating Bird Sim Coler who had been proposed by David B. Hill. (vote: Stanchfield 294, Coler 154, Mackey 1). The other candidates were nominated by acclamation.

== Result ==
The whole Republican ticket was elected.

The incumbents Woodruff, McDonough, Davies, Jaeckel and Bond were re-elected.

All five parties maintained automatic ballot status (necessary 10,000 votes).

1900 state election results
Office	Republican ticket		Democratic ticket		Prohibition ticket		Socialist Labor ticket		Social Democratic ticket	
Governor	Benjamin B. Odell Jr.	804,859	John B. Stanchfield	693,733	William T. Wardwell	22,704	Charles H. Corregan	13,672	Benjamin Hanford	13,493
Lieutenant Governor	Timothy L. Woodruff	809,234	William F. Mackey	689,829	Albert J. Rumsey	22,448	Leander A. Armstrong	13,592	William Butscher	13,312
Secretary of State	John T. McDonough	812,222	John T. Norton	686,468	Joseph V. Baker	22,789	Joseph H. Sweeney	13,415	Philip Jackson	13,239
Comptroller	Erastus C. Knight	811,828	Edward S. Atwater	687,195	Mason N. Weed	22,459	Alfred O. Kuhn	13,442	Frank Sieverman	13,169
Attorney General	John C. Davies	811,688	Thomas F. Conway	687,331	Dexter D. Dorn	22,519	Eustis Ebert	13,422	Henry L. Slobodin	13,238
Treasurer	John P. Jaeckel	811,715	John B. Judson	687,313	Fred W. Hewitt	22,553	J. E. Alexander	13,415	Leonard D. Abbott	13,175
State Engineer	Edward A. Bond	811,009	Russell R. Stuart	688,300	Emmett F. Smith	22,535	John E. Wallace	13,424	Henry Stahl	13,259

== See also ==
- New York gubernatorial elections

== Sources ==
- The tickets: THE TICKETS IN THE STATES in NYT on October 21, 1900
- The Democratic candidates: SKETCHES OF THE NOMINEES in NYT on September 13, 1900
- Result: THE STATE OFFICIAL VOTE in NYT on December 13, 1900
- Result in New York County: NEW YORK COUNTY'S VOTE in NYT on November 28, 1900
- Result: The Tribune Almanac
- The New York Red Book 1901
