= Augustus Van Wyck =

American judge (1850–1922)

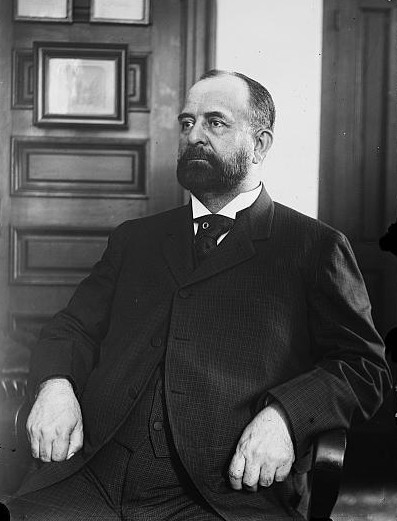
Augustus Van Wyck

Augustus Van Wyck (October 14, 1850 – June 8, 1922) was an American judge and politician who served as Supreme Court Justice of Brooklyn, New York. In 1898 he received the Democratic Nomination for New York State governor against the Republican choice, Theodore Roosevelt.

== Background ==
Augustus Van Wyck was born in New York City on October 14, 1850, a son of William Van Wyck and Lydia Ann (Maverick) Van Wyck. His brother Robert A. Van Wyck served as Mayor of New York City. Charles Van Wyck was a distant cousin; their common ancestors were Theodorus Van Wyck (1668-1753) and his wife Margretia Brinckerhoff Van Wyck. His older brother Samuel, a Confederate surgeon, was killed during the war and his sister, Lydia Ann, married Robert Hoke, a Confederate General. Roots of the Van Wyck family date back to early Dutch immigration to North America. One of the first descendants of the family, Cornelius Barents Van Wyck came from the town of Wyck, the Netherlands in 1650.

Augustus Van Wyck's education led him to Phillips Exeter Academy and the University of North Carolina at Chapel Hill to study law. Moving to Richmond, Virginia Van Wyck practiced law for a brief period before moving to Brooklyn, New York, in 1871.

He was an active member of the Democratic party in Brooklyn. In 1882 Van Wyck was elected as President of the Brooklyn Democratic Party's general committee. He also participated in several local, county, state, and national party conventions.

== Supreme Court Justice of Brooklyn ==
In 1884, Augustus Van Wyck was elected to the Superior Court in Brooklyn until transferred to the Supreme Court where he remained until 1896.

== Democratic Nomination for New York State Governor ==
Much to Van Wyck's surprise, he was nominated by his fellow Democrats to oppose Republican nominee Theodore Roosevelt in the race for Governor of New York in 1898. Although Van Wyck was seen as a strong candidate, Roosevelt's popularity in the aftermath of the Spanish–American War led him to win narrowly; Van Wyck received 643,921 votes, while Roosevelt received 661,715.

After the election Van Wyck resumed his law practice on 149 Broadway, New York.

== Death ==
He died after an operation for an "intestinal ailment" at Hahnemann Hospital on June 8, 1922, at the age of 71.

Party political offices
Preceded by Wilbur F. Porter	Democratic nominee for Governor of New York; 1898	Succeeded by John B. Stanchfield
