= John Mole (poet) =

English poet, born 1941

John Douglas Mole (born 1941) is an English poet for adults and children, born in Taunton. He is also a jazz clarinetist. Mole graduated from Magdalene College, Cambridge University, and began his career as a teacher. With the poet Peter Scupham he was co-editor of the Mandeville Press publishing house in Hitchin. He married the artist Mary Norman. His papers are preserved at Cambridge University Library.

== Poetry ==
Mole has won several prizes for his poetry, including an Eric Gregory Award (1970), the Cholmondeley Award, and the Signal Award for children's poetry. He was a writer in residence at Magdalene College, Cambridge and a poet in residence to the Poets Society in the City of London. He was also a poet in residence for the Poet in the City charity scheme.

Mole's many poems for children include "Variations on an Old Rhyme" and "The Balancing Man". Both of these discuss political issues in a way that points out their relevance to young people.

Treatment is a string of poems that amounts to a personal response to a course of chemotherapy he underwent.

A reading of his poetry for the Poetry Archive appeared on CD. It was made on 30 April 2003 at the Audio Workshop, London, and produced by Richard Carrington. His published volumes of verse include The Love Horse (Eric Morten, 1973), A Partial Light (Dent, 1975) and Our Ship (Secker & Warburg, 1979).

== Libretto ==
Mole wrote the libretto for Alban, a community opera composed by Tom Wiggall and performed in May 2009 in St Albans Cathedral. It was performed again in Holborn, London, in the autumn of 2010.

== List of publications ==
Poems

- The Love Horse (E. J. Morten, 1973, ISBN 0-901598-84-4
- A Partial Light (J. M. Dent, 1975, ISBN 0-460-02167-2
- Our Ship (Secker & Warburg, 1977, ISBN 0-436-28450-2
- From the House Opposite (Secker & Warburg, 1979, ISBN 0-436-28451-0
- Feeding the Lake
- In and Out of the Apple
- Homing
- Depending on the Light
- Selected Poems
- For the Moment
- Counting the Chimes - Selected Poems 1975–2003
- The Other Day
- The Bone in Her Leg
- The Point of Loss (Enitharmon Press, 2011, ISBN 978-1-907587-04-7
- Treatment (2013)
