= Gerald Browne (cricketer) =

English cricketer (1850–1910)

Personal information
- Full name: Gerald Elliott Kenworthy Browne
- Born: 14 May 1850; Goldington, Bedfordshire, England
- Died: 6 July 1910 (aged 60); Kilmacanogue, County Wicklow, Ireland
- Batting: Right-handed
- Relatives: Elliott Browne (brother)

Domestic team information
- Years: Team
- 1874: Gloucestershire

Career statistics
Competition	First-class
Matches	2
Runs scored	20
Batting average	6.66
100s/50s	–/–
Top score	12
Balls bowled	–
Wickets	–
Bowling average	–
5 wickets in innings	–
10 wickets in match	–
Best bowling	–
Catches/stumpings	–/–
- Source: Cricinfo, 20 April 2014

Gerald Elliott Kenworthy Browne (14 May 1850 – 6 July 1910) was an English cricketer active in mid-1870s. Browne was a right-handed batsman.

== Life ==
Born at Goldington Hall, Goldington, Bedfordshire, he was the son of William Kenworthy Browne and his wife Elizabeth Elliott. His father was a close friend of Edward FitzGerald the poet, and Gerald and his brother Elliott are mentioned in the 1904 biography of FitzGerald by Thomas Wright, as having the poet as a companion when they were boys.

His father died in 1859 after a horse-riding accident. Browne was educated at Rugby School, from 1863, with his brother, their mother living in Rugby town. He made his debut in first-class cricket for Gloucestershire against Surrey in 1874 at The Oval, with him making a second first-class appearance for the county in that season against Sussex at the County Ground, Hove. He scored 20 runs in these two matches, top-scoring with 12.

Browne died at Kilmacanogue, Ireland on 6 July 1910. His brother Elliott was also a first-class cricketer.
