= Scenes from Goethe's Faust =

Musico-theatrical work by Robert Schumann

- Musico-theatrical work by Robert Schumann
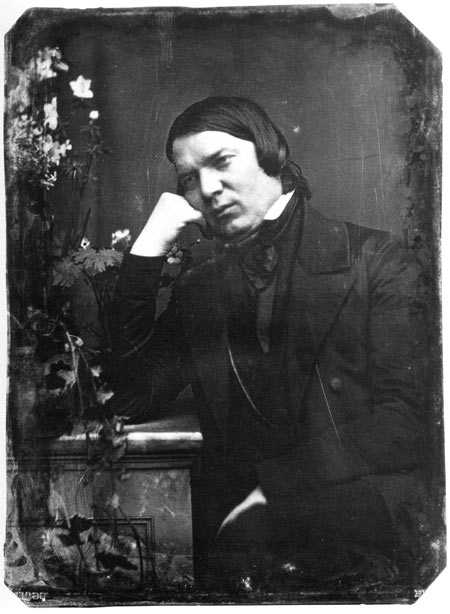
- Schumann in an 1850 daguerreotype
- Native name: Szenen aus Goethes Faust
- Catalogue: WoO 3
- Text: Faust by J. W. von Goethe
- Language: German
- Composed: 1844–53
- Performed: 29 August 1849 across Dresden, Weimar, Leipzig (Part Three only); 13 January 1862 in Cologne (full premiere)
- Duration: 2 hours
- Scoring: Orchestra, SATB chorus, children's chorus, and vocal soloists

Premiere
- Date: 13 January 1862
- Location: Cologne
- Conductor: Ferdinand Hiller
- Performers: Gürzenich Orchestra Cologne, singers including Julius Stockhausen

Scenes from Goethe's Faust (German: Szenen aus Goethes Faust), WoO 3, is a musical-theatrical work by composer Robert Schumann. The work has been described as the height of his accomplishments in the realm of dramatic music. The work was written between 1844 and 1853 and is scored for SATB chorus, boys' chorus, orchestra, and a number of solo parts which, even with doubling, require seven solo singers, although eight (three sopranos, two mezzos, one tenor, one baritone, and one bass) is the usual number for a performance. A typical performance lasts two hours.

Scenes from Goethe's Faust has often been overlooked within Schumann's oeuvre but has enjoyed a resurgence since the 1970s. The piece has been deemed among Schumann's most moving works, and a pinnacle of his quintessential Romantic concern with the extra-musical (and especially literary) potential of musical expression.

== Background ==
Schumann's work on what he labeled an oratorio began in 1842. This was just over a decade after the death of Johann Wolfgang von Goethe, who completed Part Two of the dramatic poem Faust in his final year. Many contemporary readers of Faust found Goethe's epic poem daunting and difficult to grasp. Goethe himself declared only Mozart fit to write the music for it (though Mozart died in 1791, almost 20 years prior to the completion of Part One of Faust).

Schumann explained the weight of the task before him in an 1845 letter to Felix Mendelssohn: "[A]ny composer would not only be judged by his treatment of one of the seminal and most-widely acclaimed works in German literature, but would also be setting himself up to be compared to Mozart." Yet despite Schumann's expressed reservations about the work, it has been labeled his "magnum opus." Schumann is "[d]eeply sensitive to the all-inclusiveness of Goethe's drama[.]" From the work's dark and tense overture, to its elegant and tranquil conclusion, Schumann opens wide "a manifold musical world" that coherently draws together elements of "lied, horror opera, grand opera, oratorio, and church music."

Schumann never saw all three parts of the work performed in the same concert, or published together. Eric Sams comments 'There is no coherence in the orchestration, which audibly dates from two different periods (hand-horns in Part III, valve-horns elsewhere)', leading him to conclude that Schumann did not conceive the work as a whole, although late nineteenth-century ideas of performance mean that in the modern era the piece is predominantly heard with all three parts.

On 29 August 1849, Part Three of the work was premiered simultaneously across Dresden, Leipzig, and Weimar, conducted by Schumann himself, Julius Rietz, and Franz Liszt respectively. The complete Scenes from Goethe's Faust was posthumously premiered on 13 January 1862 in Cologne with Ferdinand Hiller conducting.

== Music ==
Schumann's music suggests the struggle between good and evil at the heart of Goethe's work, as well as Faust's tumultuous search for enlightenment and peace. After the overture, the music depicts Faust's wooing of Gretchen. For Gretchen's story, Schumann employs operatic music, beginning with a love duet, proceeding to Gretchen's passionate and desperate aria, and concluding with a church scene. The second part of the work opens with stark contrast: on the one hand, the lively, fresh music of Ariel and the spirits calls Faust to savor the beauties of nature; on the other hand, in the scene following, Schumann's restless orchestration brings to the fore Faust's delusions upon hearing of a new world being created and its rapturous promise of an everlasting present. The final scenes, drawing the work to its placid yet unsettled conclusion, hold some of Schumann's best choral writing.

== Vocal Roles ==
- Faust (baritone)
- Gretchen (soprano)
- Ariel (tenor)
- Mephistopheles (bass)
- Doctor Marianus (baritone)
- Una poenitentium (soprano)
- Evil Spirit (bass)
- Pater Ecstaticus (tenor)
- Pater Seraphicus (baritone)
- Pater Profundus (bass)
- Care (soprano)
- Need (soprano)
- Guilt (alto)
- Want (alto)
- Martha (soprano)
- Magna Peccatrix (soprano)
- Mulier Samaritana (alto)
- Mater Gloriosa (alto)
- Maria Aegyptiaca (alto)

Plus 8-part double choir, 4-part children's choir

== Orchestration ==
Scenes from Goethe's Faust is scored for 2 flutes, piccolo, 2 oboes, 2 clarinets, 2 bassoons, 4 horns, 2 trumpets, 3 trombones, bass tuba, timpani, harp, and strings.

== Structure ==
Overture in D minor
Part One

- Rendezvous in Martha's Garden - Du kanntest mich, o kleiner Engel (Faust, Gretchen, Mephistopheles, Martha)
- Gretchen’s Address to the Mater Dolorosa - Ach neige, Schmerzenreiche (Gretchen)
- In the Cathedral - Wie anders, Gretchen, war dir’s (Gretchen, Evil Spirit, Chorus)

Part Two

- Sunrise - Die ihr dies Haupt umschwebt im luftgen Kreise (Ariel, Spirits, Faust)
- Midnight - Ich heiße der Mangel (Want, Guilt, Care, Need, Faust)
- Faust's Death - Herbei herbei! herein herein! (Mephistopheles, Lemurs, Faust)

Part Three: Faust's Transfiguration

- Waldung, sie schwankt Heran (Chorus)
- Ewiger Wonnebrand (Pater Ecstaticus)
- Wie Felsenabgrund mir zu Füßen (Pater Profundus, Pater Seraphicus, Chorus)
- Gerettet ist das edle Glied (Angels, Chorus)
- Hier ist die Aussicht frei (Doctor Marianus)
- Dir, der Unberührbaren (Doctor Marianus, Magna Peccatrix, Mulier Samaritana, Maria Aegyptiaca, Penitent, Blessed Boys, Gretchen, Mater Gloriosa)
- Chorus mysticus - Alles Vergängliche ist nur ein Gleichnis (Chorus)

== Discography ==
Below is an incomplete list of recordings.

Year	Conductor	Orchestra	Choirs	Vocal soloists	Label
1973	Benjamin Britten	English Chamber Orchestra	Aldeburgh Festival Singers, Wandsworth School Boys' Choir	Dietrich Fischer-Dieskau, Elizabeth Harwood, John Shirley-Quirk, Peter Pears, Felicity Palmer	Decca Records
1995	Claudio Abbado	Berlin Philharmonic	Swedish Radio Choir, Tölzer Knabenchor, Eric Ericson Chamber Choir	Bryn Terfel, Karita Mattila, Jan-Hendrik Rootering, Barbara Bonney, Endrik Wottrich, Iris Vermillion, Brigitte Poschner-Klebel, Susan Graham, Hans Peter Blochwitz, Harry Peeters	Sony Classical
1998	Philippe Herreweghe	Orchestre des Champs-Élysées, La Chapelle Royale	Collegium Vocale Gent, RIAS Kammerchor	William Dazeley, Camilla Nylund, Kristinn Sigmundsson, Simone Nold, Ingeborg Danz, Louise Mott, Hans Peter Blochwitz, Christian Voigt	Harmonia Mundi
2009	Nikolaus Harnoncourt	Royal Concertgebouw Orchestra	Netherlands Radio Choir, Netherlands Children's Choir	Christian Gerhaher, Christiane Iven, Alastair Miles, Werner Güra	RCO Live
2011	Antoni Wit	Warsaw Philharmonic Orchestra	Warsaw Philharmonic Choir, Warsaw Boys' Choir	Iwona Hossa, Christiane Libor, Anna Lubańska, Ewa Marciniec, Daniel Kirch, Jaakko Kortekangas, Andrew Gangestad	Naxos
2014	Daniel Harding	Bavarian Radio Symphony Orchestra	Bavarian Radio Choir	Christian Gerhaher, Christiane Karg, Alastair Miles, Mari Eriksmoen, Bernarda Fink, Andrew Staples, Kurt Rydl, Tareq Nazmi	BR Klassik
