= Benjamin Odell (politician) =

American politician (1854–1926)

Benjamin Barker Odell Jr.
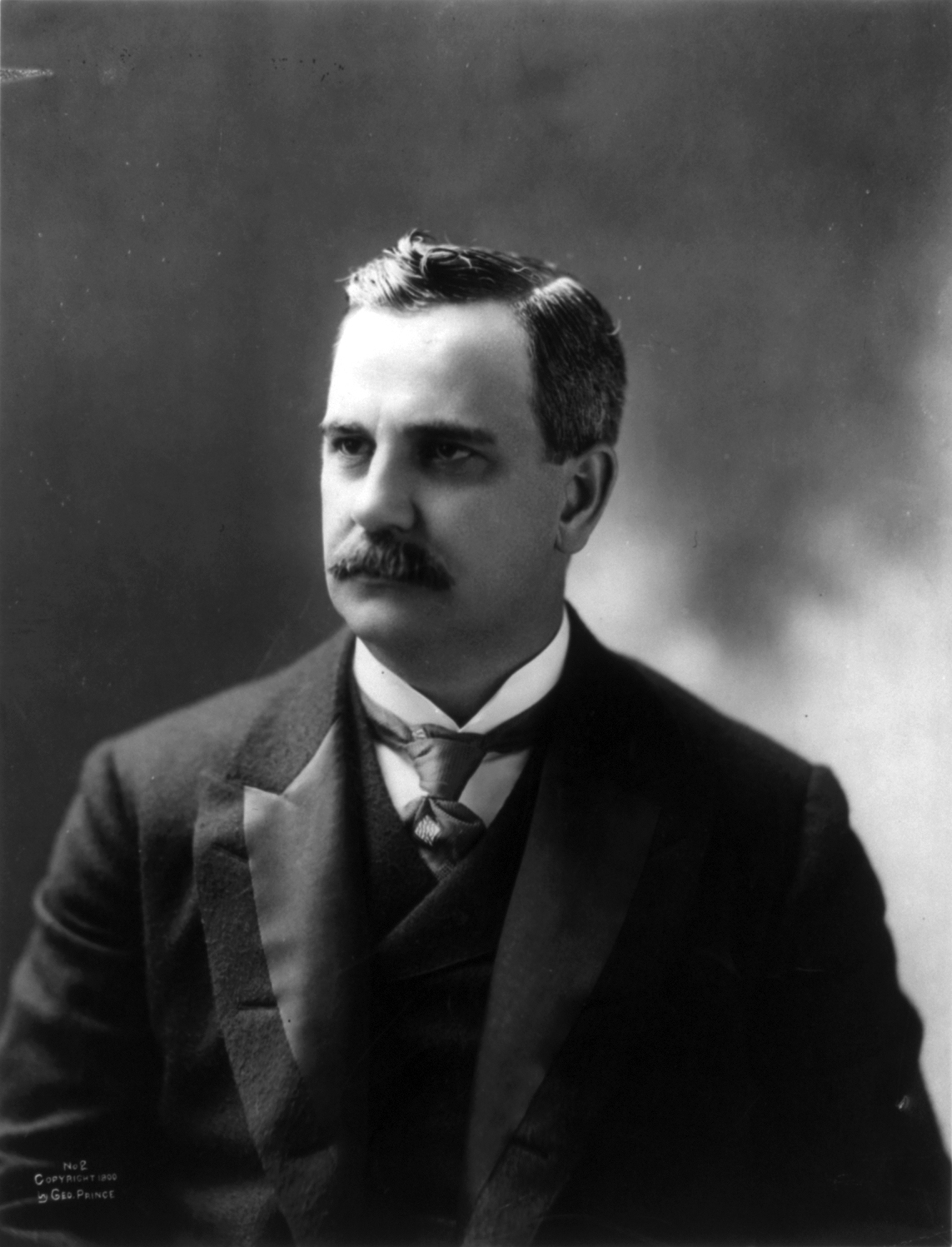

34th Governor of New York
- In office January 1, 1901 – December 31, 1904
- Lieutenant: Timothy L. Woodruff; Frank W. Higgins
- Preceded by: Theodore Roosevelt
- Succeeded by: Frank W. Higgins

Member of the U.S. House of Representatives from New York's 17th district
- In office March 4, 1895 – March 3, 1899
- Preceded by: Francis Marvin
- Succeeded by: Arthur S. Tompkins

Personal details
- Born: January 14, 1854 Newburgh, New York
- Died: May 9, 1926 (aged 72) Newburgh, New York
- Resting place: Woodlawn Cemetery
- Party: Republican
- Spouse(s): Estelle Crist (1877–88; her death); Linda C. Traphagen (c.1891–1926; his death)
- Children: 4 with second wife
- Education: Bethany College (attended); Columbia University (attended)
- Profession: Businessman, politician

Benjamin Barker Odell Jr. (January 14, 1854 – May 9, 1926) was an American businessman and politician who served as the 34th governor of New York from 1901 to 1904.

== Early life ==
Born in Newburgh, New York, in 1854, Odell's father, Benjamin B. Odell Sr., was a leading businessman who served twelve years as the city's mayor. Odell studied at Bethany College in West Virginia, and at the Columbia College of Columbia University. While he would have graduated in 1877, Odell dropped out of school in his junior year, returning to Newburgh to help in his father's business.

Odell worked his way up to head his father's ice business, starting as the driver of an ice delivery truck, earning $2 per day. Having become familiar with the people of the Newburgh area, Odell participated in the political affairs of his father, which would allow him to become involved in the politics of his home town, turning a bellwether Democratic city into one strongly Republican. He would go on to be appointed Ice Controller of New York during the First World War, and later president of both the Consolidated Gas, Electric Light, Heat, and Power Company of Newburgh and of the Central Hudson Steamboat Company. During his early days in politics, Odell ran unsuccessfully for town supervisor of New Windsor, as well as losing a bid for New York State Senate after being drafted for the Republican nomination in a heavily Democratic district.

== Early political career ==
In 1894, Odell was elected as a Republican to the 54th United States Congress, serving New York's 17th congressional district, at that time encompassing Orange, Rockland, and Sullivan Counties. He ran for, and was reelected in 1896, but declined in 1898. He became one of the most powerful New York Republican operatives in of his time, serving for ten years as chairman of the Republican State Executive Committee, both before and after his two terms in Congress. In 1896, at the state convention called by Thomas C. Platt, Odell narrowly lost nomination for governor; having received an 11–5 vote in favor of his nomination, Platt was convinced overnight that Frank S. Black was the superior candidate, and Black was subsequently nominated for, and won the governorship in 1896.

In 1898, Odell was the first to suggest to Republican boss Thomas C. Platt that Theodore Roosevelt ought to be the Republican candidate for governor, which met Platt's protest. With Platt convinced that Roosevelt was a figure who would disturb state politics, Odell used his position as the Republicans' state chairman to convince Platt that Governor Black would lose reelection if nominated in 1898. Returning as a hero from the Spanish–American War, Roosevelt's campaign, under Odell's management, would win the governorship by a comfortable margin in 1898. In his biography, then former President Roosevelt would say Odell was one of three men most responsible for his candidacy being pressed on Platt.

== Governorship (1901–1904) ==
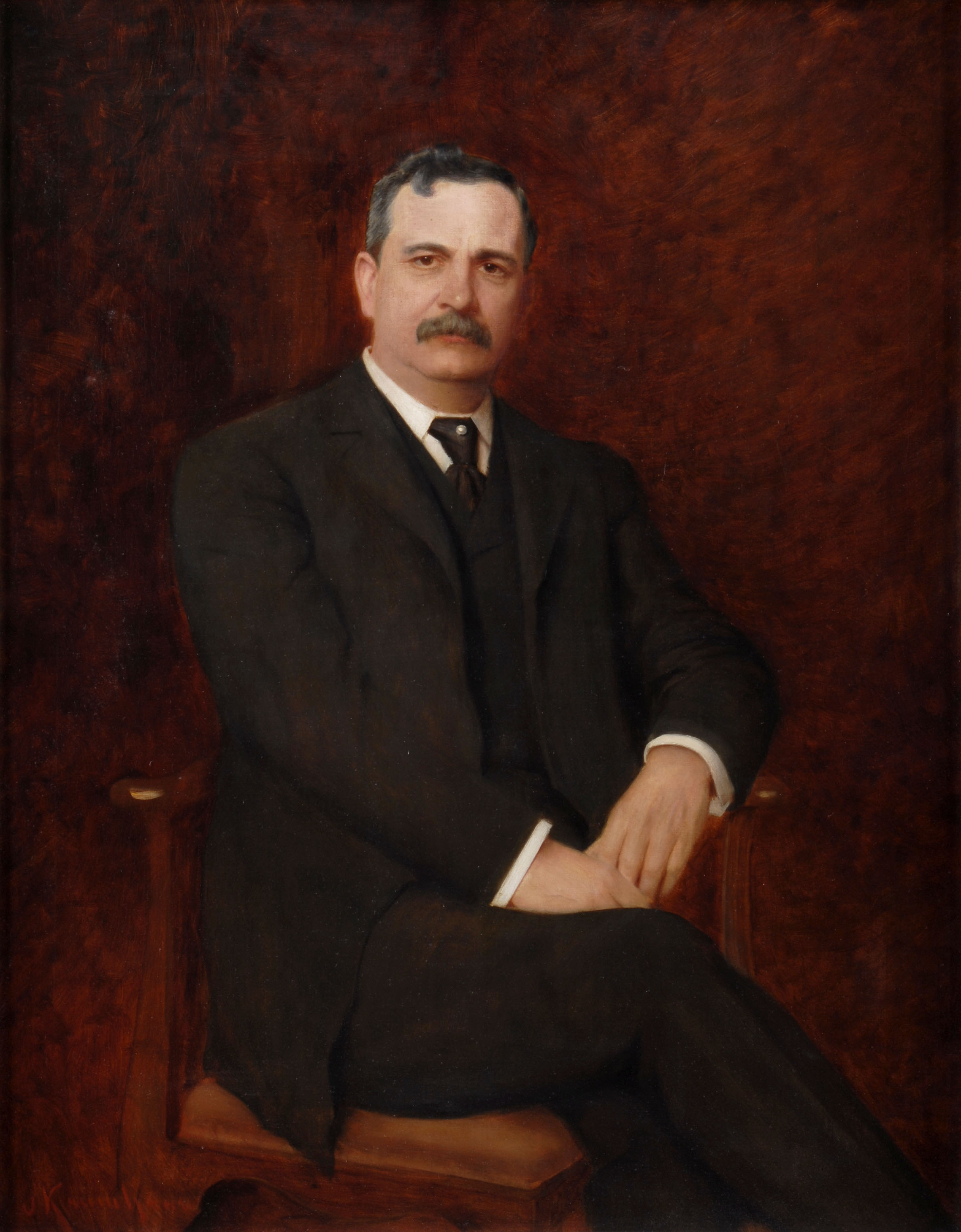
Official Gubernatorial portrait of New York Governor Benjamin B. Odell Jr.

In the state election of 1900, Thomas C. Platt wanted to 'rid himself' of Theodore Roosevelt from the governorship of New York. Devising a scheme to have Roosevelt nominated to replace the late Garret Hobart as vice president to President William McKinley, Platt placed Odell as nominee for governor in 1900. Odell would go on to handily defeat John B. Stanchfield in the general election to succeed Theodore Roosevelt as Governor of New York.

Taking office on January 1, 1901, Odell was the first New York governor of the twentieth century. As governor, Odell reduced the state tax, simplified governance of state insane asylums into the State Commission on Lunacy, and broke with allegiance to Thomas C. Platt, making independent decisions for his administration. In the state election of 1902, Odell won reelection to a second term, and Thomas Platt's control over Republican politics in the state waned.

In his second term as governor, Odell pressed for a referendum to enlarge the Erie Canal, which was approved. He opposed and vetoed "special legislation" and "personal bills" passed by the legislature, which were focused on individual interests.

=== Legacy ===
In the 1920 presidential election, Odell was a presidential elector for Warren G. Harding and Calvin Coolidge.

After six months of prolonged illness in late 1925 to early 1926, Benjamin B. Odell died on May 9, 1926, in his home town of Newburgh, surrounded by family. Odell's death came with praise from prominent New York politicians. Former secretary of state, future chief justice, and fellow former governor Charles Evans Hughes said of Odell:

Governor Odell was a strong character of great resourcefulness ... he was a man of definite principles and courage in applying them. His death is a great loss to the State.

Former governor and fellow Republican Nathan L. Miller said:

Governor Odell was a life-long friend of mine and a man whom I held in the highest esteem and had the greatest admiration for ... I regard his passing as a great personal loss. He was a man of very great ability.

Incumbent Democratic governor Al Smith said of Odell's death:

I have just learned with deep regret of [his] death ... I always regarded him as one of New York State's leading citizens and one of our great Governors.

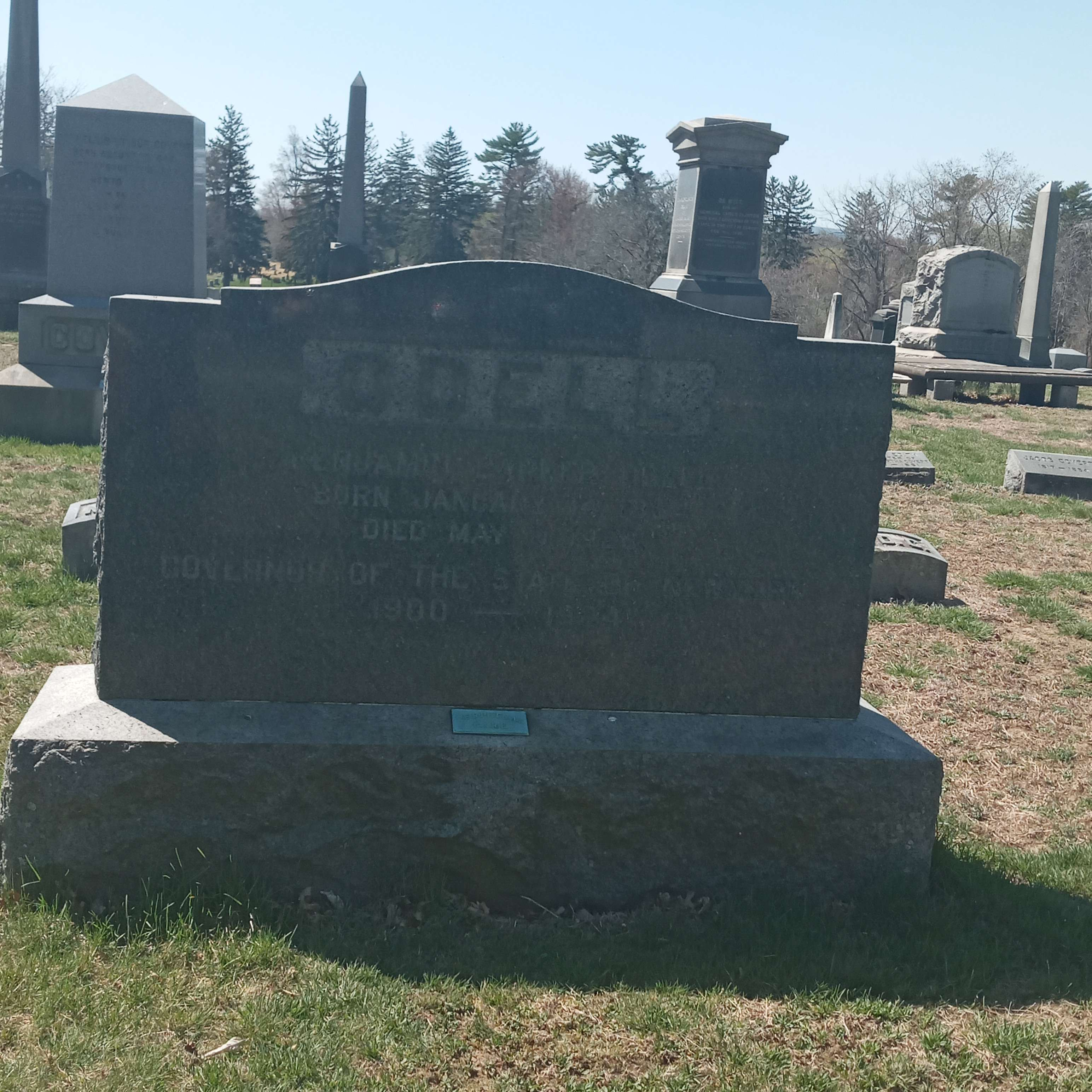
The gravesite of Governor Odell

== Sources ==
- United States Congress. "Benjamin Odell (id: O000036)". Biographical Directory of the United States Congress.
- "Ex-Gov Odell Dies at Newburgh Home". The New York Times. May 10, 1926.
- Governor Benjamin B. O'Dell Jr. at the New York Hall of Governors

U.S. House of Representatives
Preceded by Francis Marvin	Member of the U.S. House of Representatives from New York's 17th congressional district 1895–1899	Succeeded by Arthur S. Tompkins
Party political offices
Preceded by Charles W. Hackett	Chairman of the New York Republican State Committee; May 1898 – November 1900	Succeeded by George W. Dunn
Preceded by Theodore Roosevelt	Republican nominee for Governor of New York; 1900, 1902	Succeeded by Frank W. Higgins
Preceded by George W. Dunn	Chairman of the New York Republican State Committee; April 1904 – September 1906	Succeeded by Timothy L. Woodruff
Political offices
Preceded by Theodore Roosevelt	Governor of New York; 1901–1904	Succeeded by Frank W. Higgins
