= Elliott Lewis =

Eliot or Elliott Lewis may refer to:

- Elliott Lewis (politician) (1858–1935), Australian premier of Tasmania
- Elliott Lewis (actor) (1917–1990), American actor, writer and director
- Eliot Lewis (born 1962), American singer, musician, songwriter, and producer
