= Elliott Sclar =

Elliott D. Sclar is a professor of urban planning at Columbia University Graduate School of Architecture, Planning and Preservation (GSAPP). An economist and urban planner, he is the director of the Center for Sustainable Urban Development (CSUD) at Columbia University's Earth Institute. His research interests include urban economic development, transportation, and public service economics.

== Biography ==
Sclar holds a BA from Hofstra University (1963) and an MA from Tufts University (1966). He earned his PhD at Tufts (1972). Prior to his appointment at Columbia, he was an assistant professor of urban economics at Brandeis University's Heller School (1972–78).

Sclar was a co-coordinator of the Taskforce on Improving the Lives of Slum Dwellers, one of ten task forces set up by the UN Millennium Project to aid in the implementation of the United Nations' Millennium Development Goals. He was a lead author on the Taskforce's book length report (2005): A Home in the City.

Sclar is a specialist on privatization: his book You Don't Always Get What You Pay For: The Economics of Privatization (Cornell 2000) won the Louis Brownlow Award for the Best Book of 2000 from the National Academy of Public Administration and the 2001 Charles Levine Prize from the International Political Science Association and Governance magazine for a major contribution to public policy literature.
