= Alban (opera) =

Alban is a community opera in two acts with music by Tom Wiggall and libretto by John Mole.

== History ==
The opera was commissioned by St Albans Cathedral Community Trust as a celebration of the patron saint of their city. The world premiere took place in May 2009 when five performances were given in the space of four days. Composed with St Albans Cathedral in mind, the production exploited the opportunities given by the architectural design of the building. The performances were given by professional soloists with choruses composed of choristers from all around the diocese, accompanied by a chamber orchestra.

The story relates the last few days of the life of Alban, a doctor in Verulamium (modern day St Albans) and family man who was martyred around 210 AD for sheltering a Christian priest and offering himself up to save the priest's life.

The opera was described in Opera Now as "a cogent chamber opera worthy of Britten's Church Parables," which "betokens great expectations of composer and producers alike."

== Roles ==
| Role | Voice type | Premiere Cast, 20 May 2009 (Conductor: David Ireson) |
|---|---|---|
| Alban | tenor | Philip Salmon |
| Priest | bass-baritone | Paul Sheehan |
| Claudia, Alban's wife | soprano | Dominique Thiébaud |
| Lucius, Governor | bass | Des Turner |
| Marcella, Governor's wife | mezzo-soprano | Louise Mott |
| Julia, a family friend | mezzo-soprano | Ellie White |
| Melissa, Alban's daughter | girl soprano | Georgina Thomas |
| Gaius, Alban's son | treble | Peter Sequeira |
| Director | | Beckie Mills |
Chorus

== Synopsis ==
A Christian priest has been arrested as his preaching is not allowed under Roman law. Somehow he manages to escape. A lively market scene presents the community with its traders and customers. The next scene switches to Alban's home. Alban is planning to move his family to Sarum where he is to have a new job. His wife accepts the move with reluctance, but their two children, Gaius and Melissa, are quite excited.

The Christian priest arrives at Alban's house and asks for shelter. When Alban gives him refuge, his wife is concerned for their own safety. However, Alban becomes so moved by the priest's message of Christianity with its message of love and protection of the meek and poor, that he saves the priest by disguising himself in the priest's clothes when the soldiers come for the second time looking for him.

In the court scene that follows in Act Two the governor wants to delay a verdict until all the facts are firmly presented, but his wife persuades him that Alban is dangerous and should be sentenced to death immediately. Claudia pleads with her for forgiveness, but Alban is sentenced. The executioner refuses to carry out his orders and is himself put to death. Another soldier is ordered to carry out the execution. His body is carried out ceremoniously as the chorus sings a hymn of praise.
