= Elliott Arkin =

American artist

Elliott Arkin (born April 15, 1960) is an American artist. He is known for figurative sculptures of art world people. His work is in the permanent collections of the New York Public Library and the Louvre Museum's Musee des Arts decoratifs in Paris, France. In 2014, his work was the subject of a one-person exhibit at the Museum of Modern and Contemporary Art (MAMAC) in Nice, France.
