= Elliott Roosevelt =

Elliott Roosevelt may refer to:

- Elliott Roosevelt (socialite) (1860–1894), American socialite, father-in-law of President Franklin D. Roosevelt, father of Eleanor Roosevelt, younger brother of President Theodore Roosevelt, and grandfather of Gen. Elliot Roosevelt (below)
- Elliott Roosevelt (general) (1910–1990), American general, son of President Franklin D. Roosevelt, and grandson of the above
