= Robert Anderson Van Wyck =

1st Mayor of consolidated New York City (1898–1901)

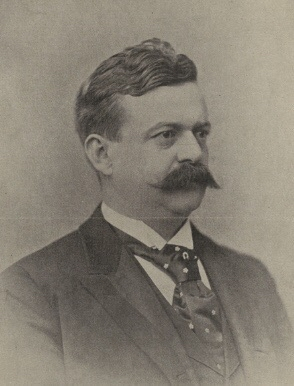
- Van Wyck in 1897

92nd Mayor of New York City
- In office January 1, 1898 – December 31, 1901
- Preceded by: William L. Strong
- Succeeded by: Seth Low

Personal details
- Born: July 20, 1849 New York City, U.S.
- Died: November 14, 1918 (aged 69) Paris, France
- Resting place: Woodlawn Cemetery
- Party: Democratic
- Spouse: Kate Elizabeth Britt (m. 1906)
- Education: Columbia University (BA)
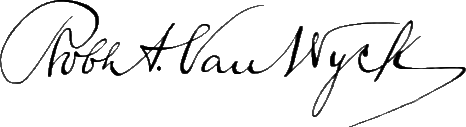
- Signature

Robert Anderson Van Wyck (/væn ˈwaɪk/ van WYKE; July 20, 1849 – November 14, 1918) was an American politician who was the first mayor of New York City after the consolidation of the five boroughs into the City of Greater New York in 1898.

== Early life and education ==
Robert Anderson Van Wyck was the son of William Van Wyck and Lydia Ann Maverick. He was one of seven children, including brothers Augustus and Samuel Maverick, the latter of whom was a Confederate Regimental Surgeon during the American Civil War. He spent much of his youth in South Carolina, where the family socialized with former Vice President John C. Calhoun among others. He studied at the Wilson Academy in North Carolina, and later graduated from Columbia Law School at Columbia University, where he was valedictorian of his class. His sister Lydia married Robert Hoke of North Carolina, a Confederate general and businessman.

== Career ==
=== Early career ===
Van Wyck began working in the banking and mercantile businesses, after which he started practicing law.

Van Wyck's business depended on his social connections. He was a member of the Holland Society, of which he became a trustee and later president. He belonged to many of the social clubs of the city and was prominent in Masonic circles, being a member of The Ancient Lodge #724, New York City.

=== Political career ===
For many years, Van Wyck took an active interest in Democratic Party matters, attending many conventions, state and national. He and a few friends who were not politically affiliated were successful in winning General Winfield Scott Hancock the Democratic Party nomination for the 1880 United States presidential election. Later, he was elected Judge of the City Court of New York, and eventually advanced to Chief Justice.

Van Wyck resigned as justice to accept the Democratic Party nomination for Mayor of New York City, and was elected in 1897 by a large majority. He served as mayor between 1898 and 1901, the first to govern it after its five boroughs had been consolidated into a single city.

As mayor, Van Wyck brought together the innumerable municipal corporations comprising the greater city. He directed construction of the Interborough Rapid Transit's first subway in Manhattan.

Van Wyck was generally regarded as selected by the leaders of Tammany Hall as a man who would do little to interfere with their running of the city. Initially highly popular as a result of his reversal of the various reforms introduced by the preceding fusion administration, his administration foundered due to the "Ice Trust" scandal of 1900. The New York World reported that the American Ice Company of Charles W. Morse planned to double the price of ice, from 30 to 60 cents per hundred pounds (45.4 kilograms). In the era before refrigeration, this had potentially fatal effects, as ice was the only preservative available to keep food, milk, and medicines fresh. The high price would have put ice beyond the reach of many of the city's poor—Tammany's main power base in the years of waves of immigration. American Ice was forced to reverse its decision due to the public outcry. Van Wyck's political rivals forced an investigation into the issue. It revealed that American Ice had secured an effective monopoly over the supply of its product to the city—it was the only company with rights to land ice at New York piers—and would have dramatically increased its profits at the new price. In addition, Van Wyck, whose salary as mayor was only $15,000, owned and had apparently not paid for $680,000 worth of American Ice stock.

The Ice Trust scandal destroyed Van Wyck's political career and was generally believed to have cost Tammany Hall the elections of 1901, which was won by the fusion reformist slate led by Seth Low. Two years later, The New York Times characterized the Van Wyck administration as one mired in "black ooze and slime". Governor Theodore Roosevelt initiated an investigation, which determined that Van Wyck had not been personally involved in the Ice Trust scandal.

== Later years and death ==
Van Wyck married Kate Elizabeth Britt on March 26, 1906. Britt had been previously married to John Hertie before his death. They enjoyed traveling. In 1906, they moved to Paris, France. He died there at the age of 69 on November 14, 1918. The funeral was held at American Holy Trinity Church. His body was returned to New York and he was buried at Woodlawn Cemetery in The Bronx, New York City.

== Legacy ==
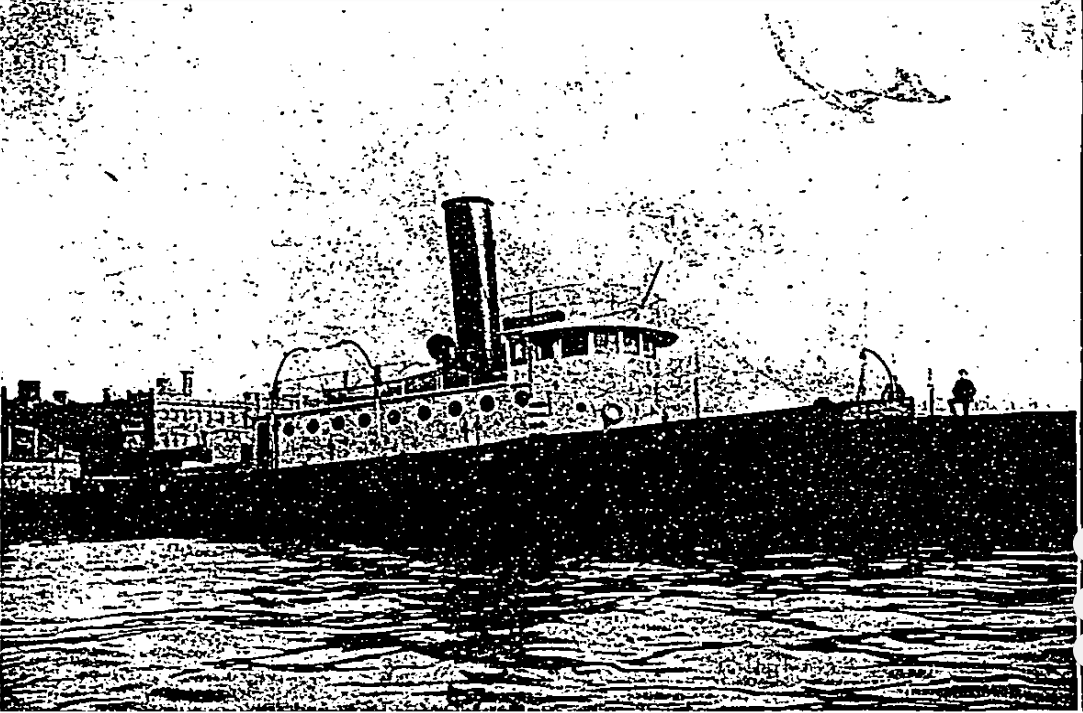
FDNY fireboat Robert A. van Wyck

- In 1898, the FDNY launched a fireboat named Robert Van Wyck.
- MS 217 in Queens is the Robert A. Van Wyck Middle School
- The Van Wyck Expressway runs in a north–south direction through Queens from John F. Kennedy International Airport in the south to the Whitestone Expressway in the north.

== See also ==
- List of people from Harlem

Political offices
Preceded by William Lafayette Strong	Mayor of New York City; 1898—1901	Succeeded by Seth Low
