= Elliott Galkin =

Elliott W. Galkin
- Born: February 22, 1921; Brooklyn, New York, United States
- Died: May 25, 1990 (aged 69); Baltimore, Maryland, United States
- Education: Brooklyn College; Cornell University; Conservatoire de Paris
- Occupation: Music critic
- Employer: Peabody Institute
- Spouse: Ruth Galkin
- Relatives: Jascha Heifetz (uncle)

Elliott Washington Galkin (1921 - May 25, 1990) was an American music instructor, critic and conductor. He was the music critic of The Baltimore Sun from 1962 to 1977 and the director of the Peabody Institute from 1977 to 1982. He authored a book about orchestral conducting.

== Early life ==
Galkin was born in 1921 in Brooklyn, New York City. One of his uncles was violinist Jascha Heifetz. Galkin graduated from Brooklyn College, earned a master's degree and PhD from Cornell University, and studied under Nadia Boulanger at the Conservatoire de Paris.

== Career ==
Galkin began his career as a music instructor at Goucher College. He joined the Peabody Institute in Baltimore in 1957, and he served as its director from 1977 to 1982.

Galkin was the music critic of The Baltimore Sun from 1962 to 1977, and the president of the Music Critics Association from 1975 to 1977. He received the ASCAP-Deems Taylor Award for his criticism.

Galkin occasionally conducted the Baltimore Symphony Orchestra. He authored a book about conducting in 1988.

== Death ==
Galkin died on May 25, 1990, in Baltimore, Maryland, at age 69.

== Selected works ==
- Galkin, Elliott (1988). A History of Orchestral Conducting in Theory and Practice. New York City: Pendragon Press. ISBN 9780918728449. OCLC 869061584.
