= James Kennedy McGuire =

American mayor (1868–1923)

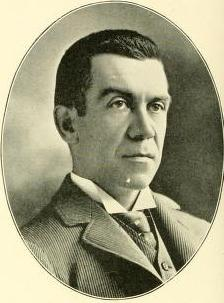

Mayor of Syracuse
- In office 1896–1902

Personal details
- Born: July 2, 1868 New York City, New York, United States
- Died: June 30, 1923 (aged 54) Washington, D.C., United States
- Party: Democratic

James Kennedy McGuire (July 12, 1868 – June 30, 1923) was the Mayor of Syracuse, New York from 1895 to 1902. He was a member of Tammany Hall.

== Biography ==
In 1902 he was Chairman of the Executive Committee of the Democratic State Committee. When indicted in 1913 he fled to Puerto Rico.

== Works ==
- The King, the Kaiser and Irish Freedom (1915)
