= Elliott Earls =

Graphic designer, artist, and one man band performer

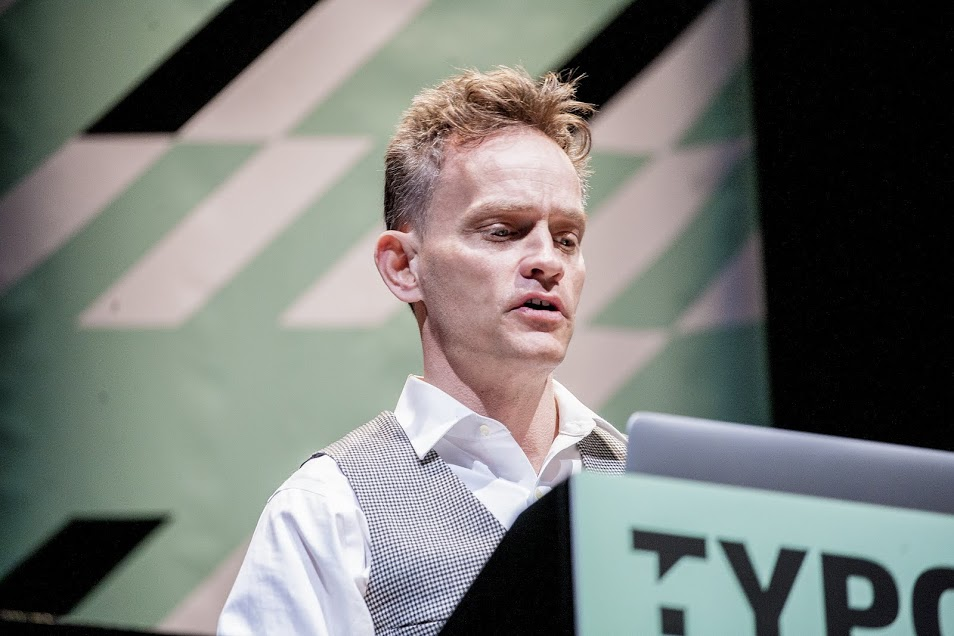
- Elliott Earls in 2014
- Born: 1966 (age 59–60)
- Occupations: graphic designer, performance artist

Elliott Peter Earls (born 1966) is an American graphic designer, artist and one man band performance artist. He is an artist-in-residence and head of the graduate graphic design department at the Cranbrook Academy of Art.

== Early life ==
Earls attended St. Xavier, a Jesuit all-boys high school, in Cincinnati, Ohio, where he focused on athletics. After high school, he attended and graduated from the Rochester Institute of Technology (RIT) in 1988. Earls then attended Cranbrook Academy of Art for graduate school; he completed his MFA there in 1993.

== Career ==
=== Graphic design ===
After graduating from RIT, Earls worked at de Harak and Poulin Associates in New York. Next he worked with David Cundy in New Canaan. In 1995, Earls created a CD of his design work called "The Apollo Program", which was named after the NASA program. In the mid-1990s, he developed three unusual typefaces: Dysphasia, Dysplasia and Dyslexia. His next CD-ROM was entitled Eye Sling Shot Lions. He worked for a few months as a graphic designer at Elektra Records. He also worked for Nonesuch Records, Little Brown, Scribner and the Cartoon Network. He has been called a "grunge graphic designer" for his creation of "distorted...older typefaces" and "aggressively illegible" type which adopted the "unkempt expressiveness" of the "grunge [music] aesthetic"; Earls' radical, anti-establishment approach was influenced by the Dada movement. One of his typefaces which has been called "grunge"-styled is Dysphasia.

After his "grunge" period, he developed cleaner-lined fonts, such as "Venus Diode, Jig Saw Dropshadow and Typhoid Mary". He has been an artist-in-residence at Cranbrook Academy of Art; as of 2002, he was the second person to hold this appointment. Earls became head of the graduate graphic design program at Cranbrook in 2001. His work is in the Smithsonian Cooper-Hewitt National Design Museum, the Wolfsonian Museum, the Miami Art Museum, the Triennale Museum in Milan; the Cranbrook Art Museum; and in the University of Akron. During 2000 and 2001, Earls was an artist in residence in Fabrica, Benetton’s design studio in Treviso, Italy. Earls has been a teacher of "design, typography, and new media at the State University of New York at Purchase".

=== Performances ===
Earls does "one man band" performance art shows in which he "...delivers spoken texts, sings, acts,...uses computers to trigger a flow of random graphic imagery on big screens", plays guitar and turns various machines and devices on. His first show was in 1997 in Soho in New York City, followed by 1999 and 2000 performances at the Culture Mart Festival (also in Soho). Earls has done shows at the Walker Art Center (Minneapolis); the Oak Street Theatre (Portland, Maine); Experimenta 99 (Lisbon); Opera Totale (Venice, Italy); Typo 2000 (Berlin); Living Surfaces (Park City Utah); at the Vernissage at Art Basel; the Exit Festival; and in Detroit's Music Hall. Earls is a member of the music group named The Venomous Sons of Jonah. The group recorded music for Earls' performance art show entitled Bull and Wounded Horse. Earls won the Emerging Artist Grant for his performance art from the Wooster Group. In 2002, California based Emigre Inc. released "Catfish" a 55-minute documentary of Earls performance work. "Catfish" was released on DVD as Issue 62 of Emigre Magazine. In July, 2019 Earls re-released the original footage from "Catfish" as Episode 85 of his Studio Practice YouTube series.

=== Filmmaker ===
Earls made a film entitled Catfish in 2002. It is a documentary which includes "...highly manipulated digital film..., animation, stop motion photography, drawing, typography and live action". From 2008 to 2014 Earls worked on a feature-length improvisational digital film entitled "The Saranay Motel." After the film was test screened at the Palladium Theater in Birmingham, Michigan, it underwent an extensive re-edit. The final version of the film has never been publicly screened. Earls stated in Artist-in-Residence lectures that a near complete re-edit of the film exists. Many clips from the film have been shown in episodes of his Studio Practice YouTube Series.

=== YouTube series ===
Earls created the YouTube channel "Studio Practice" in December 2015. Episodes of Studio Practice focus on "issues that animate the artist and designer studio." Episodes are a mixture of conceptual issues related to art with animation, graphics and sketch comedy. Notable episodes of Studio Practice include Episode 30 "Electronic Music Synth As Critique Tool In Contemporary Art." In Episode 30 Earls presents his "ADSR (Attack, Decay, Sustain, Release) Method For The Evaluation of Works of Art." Earls ADSR Method metaphorically "understands the work of art as a kind of [synthesizer] wave form," and presents a method for the critical assessment of works of art and design.

=== Aesthetics and theorization ADSR model ===
On 15 December 2016 in Episode 30 of Studio Practice, Earls outlined his ADSR "ADSR (Attack, Decay, Sustain, Release) Method For The Evaluation of Works of Art." ASDR is an approach to sound synthesis. In the Earls ADSR Method, works of art and design can be evaluated (critically assessed) through a waveform model.

In this model, the "Attack" phase of the work corresponds with Charles Sanders Peirce's Concept of "Firstness" and is understood to be the "immediate emotional, phenomenological and optical reaction to the work" in the first one-onehundred thousandth of a second in the presence of a work of art/design.

The "Decay" phase begins the moment the work "is subjected to a cognitive load." Decay marks the moment the individual in the presence of the object of art/design "begins to think through the work." It is "when we attempt to make sense of the art experience." Earls has written and stated "Works of Art must be able to endure, and more importantly reward a sustained cognitive load."

This statement is related to both the Decay and the Sustain of the art experience. For Earls, "Sustain" is the "level of intellectual, emotional, or phenomenological traction in the direct presence of the work." In the "Sustain" stage, "some works reward deep thinking, others punish."

According to Earls, the "Release" phase of a work of art/design begins the moment one leaves the presence of the object/experience, and "is a measure of the level of cognitive persistence of a work after the viewer has left the direct presence of the object/experience."
