= Timothy L. Woodruff =

American politician (1858–1913)

Lieutenant Governor of New York
- In office January 1, 1897 – December 31, 1902
- Governor: Frank S. Black; Theodore Roosevelt; Benjamin Barker Odell
- Preceded by: Charles T. Saxton
- Succeeded by: Frank W. Higgins

Personal details
- Born: Timothy Lester Woodruff; August 4, 1858 New Haven, Connecticut, U.S.
- Died: October 12, 1913 (aged 55)
- Resting place: Green-Wood Cemetery
- Party: Republican
- Spouse(s): Cora Eastman (m. 1880; died 1904) Isabel Morrison (m. 1905)
- Parent: John Woodruff (father)
- Education: Yale College; Eastman Business College
- Occupation: Businessman; politician

Timothy Lester Woodruff (August 4, 1858 – October 12, 1913) was an American businessman and politician. A leader of the Republican Party in the state of New York, Woodruff is best remembered for having been elected three terms as the lieutenant governor of the state, serving in that capacity from 1897 to 1902.

== Early life ==
Timothy Lester Woodruff was born August 4, 1858, in New Haven, Connecticut. He was the son of a United States Congressman, Rep. John Woodruff and his wife, the former Harriet Jane Lester.

Woodruff graduated from Yale College in 1879, where he was a member of the secret society Skull and Bones. Following graduation from Yale, Woodruff enrolled in Eastman Business College of Poughkeepsie, New York, in preparation for a career in business and commerce.

== Early career ==
After leaving Eastman's College, Woodruff went to New York City where he was hired as a clerk for a wholesale salt supplier. Within a year Woodruff was made a partner in the firm. Woodruff also became involved in warehousing on the Brooklyn waterfront, gaining a controlling interest in several commercial frontages and two grain elevators. This warehousing operation was consolidated in January 1888 as the Empire Warehouse Company, which in turn became the Brooklyn Grain Warehouse Company in May 1889.

Woodruff maintained other commercial interests as well, serving as president and principal proprietor of the Maltine Manufacturing Company, as president of the Smith Premier Typewriter Company, and as a director of the Merchants' Exchange National Bank.

As a prosperous businessman and avid fisherman Woodruff found himself with the means to purchase land and a summer cabin on Sumner Lake in the Adirondacks near the Hamilton County town of Long Lake. Woodruff later purchased additional land in the Adirondacks, where he developed a popular commercial camp called Kamp Kill Kare.

== Political career ==
Woodruff caricatured on the cover of Puck magazine in October 1902 as being restrained from the U.S. Senate by petty ward politics.

In 1881, Woodruff entered politics as a member of the Brooklyn Young Republicans, working for the successful election of Seth Low as Mayor of Brooklyn. Woodruff rose through the party ranks, being elected as a delegate to the 1888 Republican National Convention which nominated Benjamin Harrison for President.

Woodruff was elected to the New York Republican State Committee in 1889, serving in that capacity until 1890. He eventually became the head of the party's organization in Kings County, New York, and later Chairman of the New York State Republican Committee.

In January 1896, Woodruff was appointed Brooklyn Park Commissioner, in which capacity he was an early leader in the construction of bicycle paths, constructing routes from Prospect Park to Coney Island. In 1896, Woodruff petitioned to the New York State Board of Regents to create a "coeducational college" in Brooklyn.

Woodruff was elected three times as Lieutenant Governor of New York and served from 1897 to 1902. In the process Woodruff became the only Lieutenant Governor in New York history to serve under three different Governors — Frank S. Black, Theodore Roosevelt, and Benjamin Barker Odell, Jr. As Lieutenant Governor, Woodruff took a leadership role in the Association for the Protection of the Adirondacks, helping to protect the forests there from the devastation of clear cutting and large scale damming projects. He was president of the New York State Agricultural Society in 1900.

From 1896 to 1908, Woodruff served as the First President of the Adelphi College Board of Trustees. In 1908, Woodruff stepped down from the presidency but remained an active member until his death in 1913.

== Personal life ==
In 1880 he married Cora Eastman, the daughter of the founder of Eastman Business College. In 1904, Woodruff's wife Cora died. He was remarried the next year to the former Isabel Morrison of New York City.

On the evening of September 29, 1913, Woodruff experienced an attack of "apoplexy" (stroke) while speaking at a political event at Cooper Union in New York. Upon taking the stage he reportedly commented, "My legs feel queer," but proceeded to give his speech before eventually collapsing. Those around him were initially optimistic about his recovery, but his condition took a turn for the worse on the night of October 11. He remained paralyzed for twenty-four hours before succumbing to his illness on October 12 at 9:15 pm. His death was attributed to "apoplexy, complicated by thrombosis of the cerebral vessels." His funeral was held at the Central Congregational Church in Brooklyn on October 15, and he was buried in Green-Wood Cemetery. Recalling his days as New York State Governor, Theodore Roosevelt stated, "He was my staunch friend throughout the term of our joint service."

== Legacy ==
A collection of Woodruff's correspondence with his father is housed at the Yale University Library in New Haven, Connecticut. Included are 13 reels of microfilm which include 11,643 frames of published and unpublished material documenting Woodruff's career.

== Footnotes ==
Political offices
Preceded by Charles T. Saxton	Lieutenant Governor of New York; 1897–1902	Succeeded by Frank W. Higgins
Party political offices
Preceded by Charles T. Saxton	Republican nominee for Lieutenant Governor of New York; 1896, 1898, 1900	Succeeded by Frank W. Higgins
Preceded by Benjamin Barker Odell, Jr.	Chairman of the New York Republican State Committee; September 1906 – October 1910	Succeeded by Ezra P. Prentice
