= Elliott Browne (cricketer) =

English cricketer (1847–1915)

Personal information
- Born: 10 October 1847; Goldington Hall, Bedfordshire
- Died: 10 March 1915 (aged 67); Bournemouth, Hampshire
- Batting: Right-handed

Domestic team information
- Years: Team
- 1872: Gloucestershire
- Source: Cricinfo, 4 April 2014

Elliott Browne (10 October 1847 – 10 March 1915) was an English cricketer. He played four matches for Gloucestershire in 1872. His brother Gerald was also a first-class cricketer.

He was the elder son of William Kenworthy Browne of Goldington. His father died in 1859 after a horse-riding accident; he was educated at Rugby School, from 1863, with his brother. He matriculated at New College, Oxford in 1866, graduating B.A. in 1870 and M.A. in 1881. He became vicar of North Stoneham.
