= Elliott B. Norris =

American politician

Elliott B. Norris (June 25, 1845 – March 20, 1918) was an American farmer and politician from New York.

== Life ==
Norris was born on June 25, 1845, in Sodus, New York, the son of farmer Rufus F. Norris and Louise Kingsley. Other than a brief period from 1867 to 1868, where he worked as a merchant in Greenville, Pennsylvania, he lived in Sodus his whole life.

Norris attended Hillsdale College in Michigan and Eastman Business College. He worked as a farmer in Sodus. He was a larger breeder of thoroughbred Shorthorn cattle an extensive fruit grower. He was a member of the fruit firm Case & Norris. He was also very involved in the Granger movement. He was a charter member of the Sodus Grange and was master for 16 years. He was also lecturer and master of the Wayne County Grange. He was elected overseer of the State Grange in 1894 and, in, he was elected master of the State Grange, holding office until 1906. As master, he helped grow the State Grange and instituted several new policies, including having a Grange Day at the New York State Fair, establishing the Farmers' and Trader Life Insurance Co., and offering a scholarship for Cornell University. In his eight years as master, the State Grange gained 26,000 members and expanded into three more counties.

In 1890, Norris was elected to the New York State Assembly as a Democrat, representing the Wayne County 1st District. He sat in the Assembly in 1891. In the 1898 New York state election, he was the Democratic candidate for New York State Treasurer. He lost the election to John P. Jaeckel.

In 1868, Norris married Georgianna Chipman of Wolcott. Their children were Mabel I., Floy E., Amy L., Louise E. and Mark. Georgianna was an active member in the Grange movement, as master of the Sodus Grange and secretary of the Wayne County Grange. He was a freemason and a member of the Presbyterian Church.

Norris died at home on March 20, 1918. He was buried in Sodus Rural Cemetery.

New York State Assembly
Preceded by John P. Bennett (New York)	New York State Assembly; Wayne County, 1st District; 1891	Succeeded by George W. Brinkerhoff
