= Eliot Morris =

American singer-songwriter

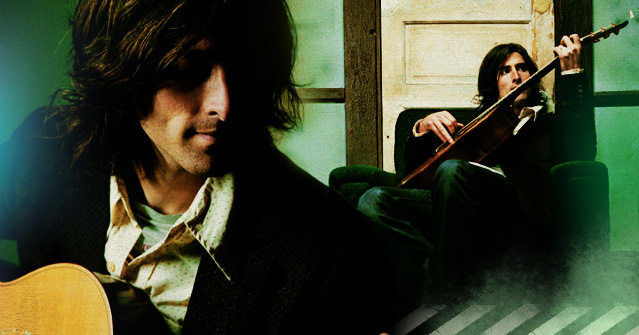

Background information
- Born: c. 1977 (age 48–49)
- Origin: Birmingham, Alabama, U.S.
- Genres: Acoustic, folk rock, pop
- Occupations: Singer, songwriter, musician
- Instruments: Voice, guitar
- Label: Unsigned
- Website: eliotmorris.net

Eliot Morris (born 1977) is an American singer, songwriter, and musician.

== Biography ==
Eliot Morris grew up one of six kids in his parents' house in Mobile, Alabama. A typical southern upbringing with typical boyhood interests, until the day his father brought home a CD player and a Motown compilation. He met Chris Sevier, and the two began writing and recording songs and playing the occasional show. After a number of years Eliot decided to pursue music as a solo artist. He went to Auburn University in 1999, where he graduated with a degree in Finance. It was at Auburn University, where Morris, playing open mics and writer's nights, really came to believe that he was writing some special songs. He released his own independent record in 2002. Shortly after, Morris caught the eye of Gary Gersh, who helped discover Nirvana, Counting Crows, Hole and Mars Volta. Gersh signed Eliot to his Strummer Records.

Morris began recording What's Mine Is Yours in October 2004. He'd originally been signed to Strummer Records, a Universal subsidiary that "went away" as Morris says, in a typical industry reorganization. Morris tried to build his solo status by CD sharing, and touring locally, as well as on side stages of big names such as John Mayer, Counting Crows, and James Taylor. The first single from the album was “Balancing the World.” Crayola also helped with building his recognition by using his song, “This Colorful World,” in one of their commercials. Today, Morris resides in Memphis, Tennessee.

== Discography ==
=== Albums ===
- Eliot Morris (2002)
- Eliot Morris Sampler (2005)
- Joe Muggs' Coffee House CD Volume 1 (2003)
- What's Mine Is Yours (2006)
- All Things in Time (2010)
