= John B. Stanchfield =

American politician

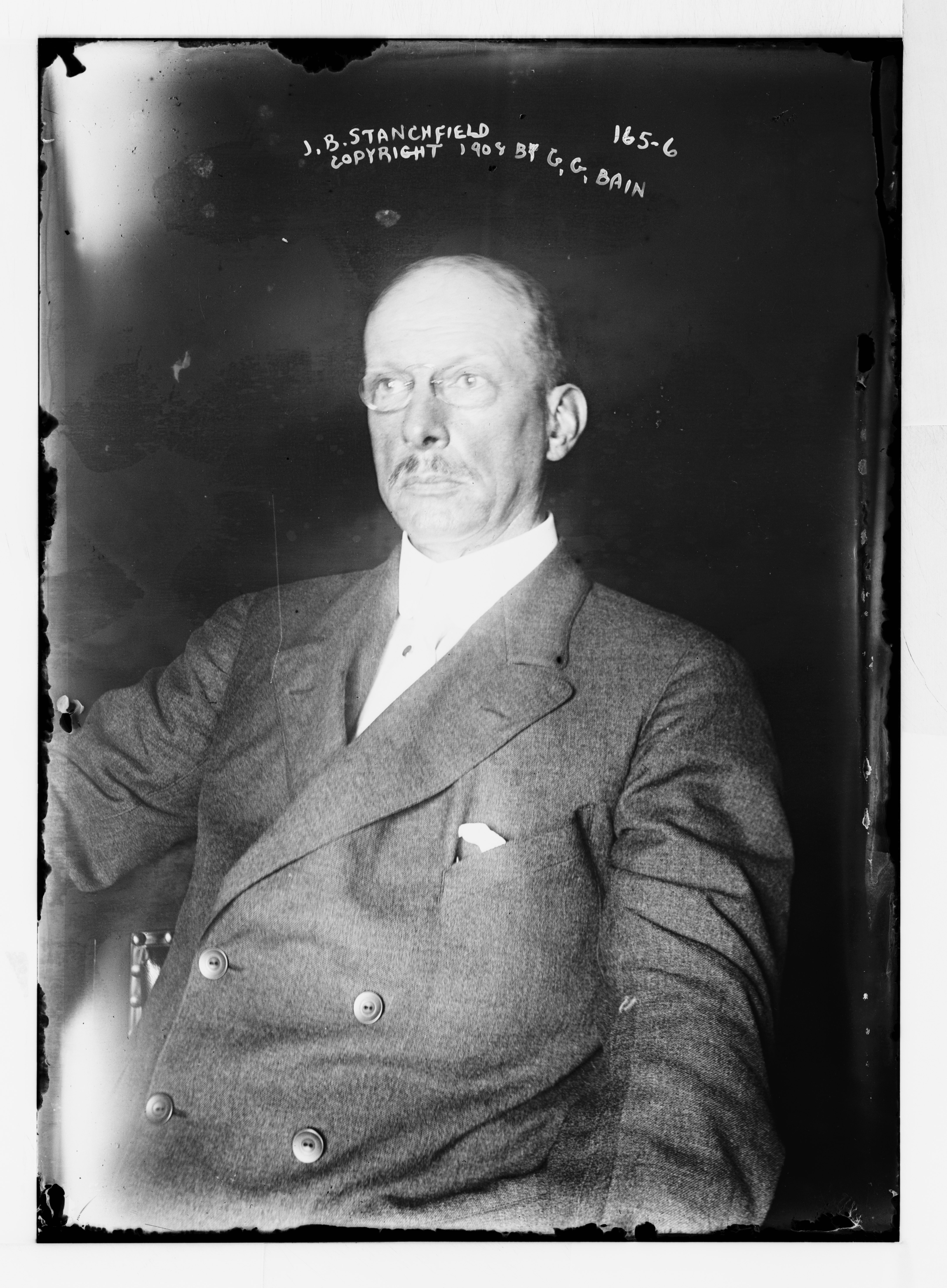

Member of the New York State Assembly
- In office January 1, 1895 – December 31, 1896
- Preceded by: Robert P. Bush
- Succeeded by: John H. Holbert
- Constituency: Chemung County

Mayor of Elmira, New York
- In office 1886–1888
- Preceded by: Charles S. Davison
- Succeeded by: Henry Flood

District Attorney of Chemung County, New York
- In office 1880–1885
- Preceded by: Jacob Sloat Fassett
- Succeeded by: Edgar Denton

Personal details
- Born: John Barry Stanchfield; March 13, 1855 Elmira, New York, US
- Died: June 25, 1921 (aged 66) Islip, New York, US
- Resting place: Woodlawn Cemetery, Elmira, New York, US
- Party: Democratic
- Spouse: Clara S. Spaulding (m. 1886)
- Children: 2
- Education: Amherst College; Harvard Law School
- Occupation: Lawyer

John Barry Stanchfield (March 13, 1855 – June 25, 1921) was an American lawyer and politician from New York. He was a prominent litigator and the Democratic gubernatorial candidate in 1900.

== Life ==
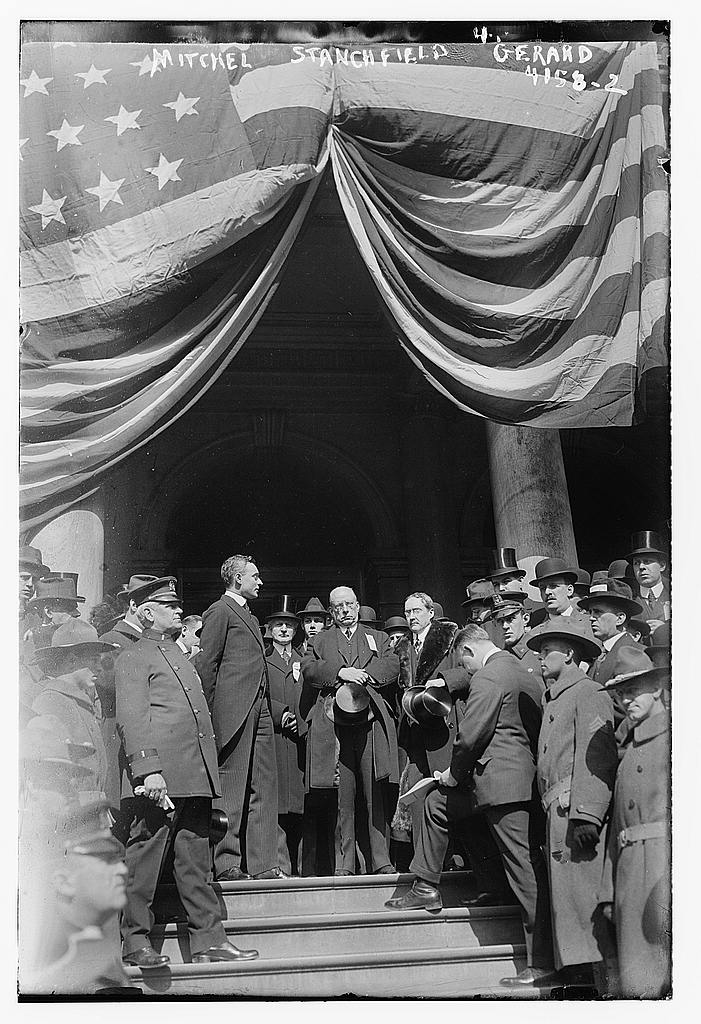
John Purroy Mitchel and James Watson Gerard and John Barry Stanchfield in 1917

John B. Stanchfield was born in Elmira, New York, on March 13, 1855, the son of Dr. John K. Stanchfield. He graduated from Amherst College in 1876, and from Harvard Law School in 1878. He commenced the practice of law in Elmira in partnership with David B. Hill, later Governor of New York (1885–1891). Afterwards he was a partner in the Elmira law firm of Reynolds, Stanchfield & Collin (named Sayles & Evans since 1945).

Stanchfield was District Attorney of Chemung County from 1880 to 1885; and Mayor of Elmira, New York, from 1886 to 1888. He married Clara S. Spaulding on September 2, 1886, and they had two children. He was a member of the New York State Assembly for Chemung Co. in 1895 and 1896; and was Minority Leader in 1896. Afterwards he removed to New York City, and became a partner in the New York City law firm of Chadbourne, Stanchfield & Levy (now Chadbourne & Parke).

In the 1900 New York state election, he ran for Governor of New York, but was defeated by Republican Benjamin B. Odell Jr. In 1903, Stanchfield was the Democratic candidate for U.S. Senator from New York, but was defeated by the incumbent Republican Thomas C. Platt.

Stanchfield was a delegate to the 1904 and 1912 Democratic National Conventions, and a delegate to the New York State Constitutional Convention of 1915.

He died of kidney failure at his home in Islip at the age of 66, and was buried at Woodlawn Cemetery in Elmira.

== Cases ==
Shortly after his removal to New York City, he appeared for Richard Albert Canfield and secured the dismissal of an indictment, earning a fee of $30,000.

In 1909, he defended F. Augustus Heinze against accusations of misapplying funds of the Mercantile National Bank, and received a fee of $800,000 after Heinze's acquittal.

He represented the State of New York at the impeachment trial of Governor William Sulzer in 1913, and at the trial of the suspended Socialist assemblymen (Louis Waldman, August Claessens, Charles Solomon) in 1920.

In 1915, he secured the release of Harry Kendall Thaw from the Matteawan State Hospital for the Criminally Insane.

Party political offices
Preceded by Augustus Van Wyck	Democratic nominee for Governor of New York; 1900	Succeeded by Bird Sim Coler
New York State Assembly
Preceded by Robert P. Bush	New York State Assembly; Chemung County; 1895–1896	Succeeded by John H. Holbert
Political offices
Preceded by Samuel J. Foley	Minority Leader in the New York State Assembly; 1896	Succeeded by Daniel E. Finn
