= Elliott Morris (rugby league) =

English rugby league footballer

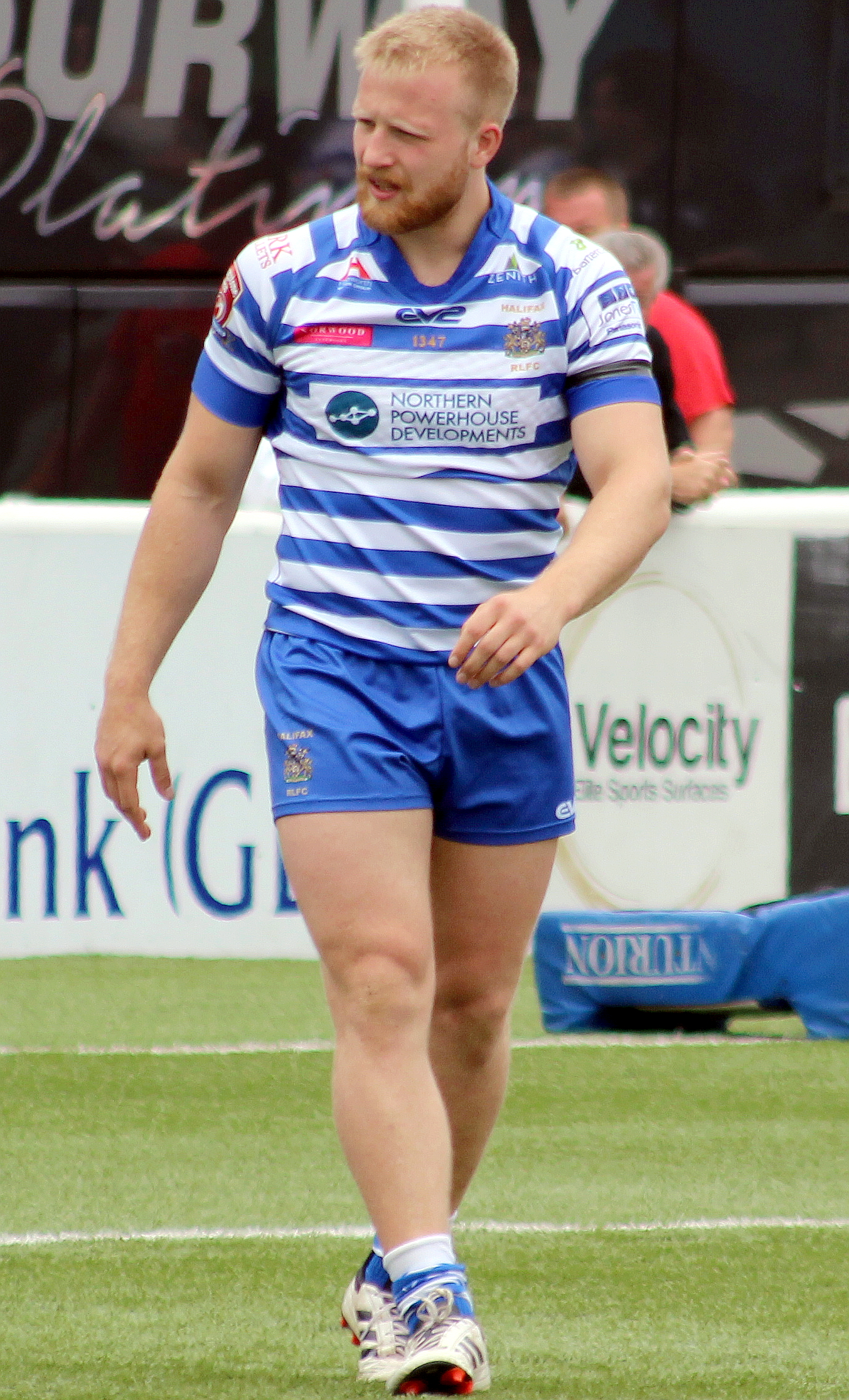

Personal information
- Full name: Elliot Morris
- Born: 4 January 1996 (age 30)

Playing information
- Position: Prop, Loose forward
Club
Years	Team	Pld	T	G	FG	P
2016–22	Halifax Panthers	109	11	0	0	44
2022(loan)	→ Dewsbury Rams	5	0	0	0	0
2023–24	Dewsbury Rams	47	1	0	0	4
2025–	Midlands Hurricanes	19	1	0	0	4
	Total	180	13	0	0	52
- Source: As of 23 September 2025

Elliott Morris (born 4 January 1996) is an English professional rugby league footballer who plays as a prop or loose forward for Midlands Hurricanes in the Betfred League 1.

== Playing career ==
=== Midlands Hurricanes ===
On 14 Oct 2024 it was reported that he had signed for Midlands Hurricanes in the RFL League 1
