= Elliott Wilson (cricketer) =

English cricketer

Cricket information
- Batting: Right-handed
- Bowling: Right-arm medium

Career statistics
Competition	First-class	List A
Matches	31	33
Runs scored	1,416	526
Batting average	26.22	19.48
100s/50s	3/7	0/3
Top score	116	62
Catches/stumpings	18/–	11/–
- Source: Cricinfo, 8 November 2022

Elliott James Wilson (born 3 November 1976) is a former English cricketer who played county cricket for Worcestershire. He was born in St Pancras, London and educated at Felsted School. He studied at Durham University.

As a schoolboy, he played representative rugby and hockey, captaining ESCA South schools at cricket. While at university, he played for Worcestershire and British Universities, scoring 85 and 49 against the 1999 New Zealand cricket team that went on to beat the England cricket team in that summer's test series.

Wilson made his first-team debut for Worcestershire against Northamptonshire in July 1998. Later that month he scored 61 in his first game opening the batting against reigning World Champions Sri Lankans, and two days later was selected to make his first-class debut against Yorkshire. Wilson remained in the side for the remainder of the season.

In 1999 while still at university Wilson played nine first-class matches (8 for Worcestershire and 1 for British Universities) in 1999 scoring 536 runs at 35.73, including 116 against Middlesex and three further half-centuries; while in List A games he scored two fifties.

In 2000, he was a regular selection for his county, playing 17 first-class games, and scoring two further centuries including carrying his bat through an innings for 104 not out in a team total of 182 in a victory at New Road against Middlesex.

Wilson spent the 2000–2001 winter playing grade cricket in Australia but contracted a serious spinal infection after a regulation injection which ended his cricket career.

Wilson now works in finance owning UK financial advising company Cambridge Pensions Ltd. He splits his time between the UK and Bermuda and as of 2022 was part of the coaching team for the Bermuda national cricket team.

In November 2020 he became the second person to swim solo 70 km around Bermuda without a support boat or co-swimmer.
