= Louise Mott =

British mezzo-soprano

Louise Mott is a British mezzo-soprano.

She is a graduate of the Guildhall School of Music, Royal College of Music and National Opera Studio and she has performed in a number of opera roles for opera companies including English Touring Opera, Opera North, English National Opera, Welsh National Opera, the Early Opera Company, The Opera Group and Diva Opera. She has also appeared as a soloist with the ensemble Endymion and the Hebrides Ensemble.

== Recordings ==
- Rutland Boughton Songs – Louise Mott (mezzo-soprano), Alexander Taylor (piano) Label: British Music Society.
- Edward Rushton: The Shops – Richard Burkhard (bass), Anna Dennis (soprano), Louise Mott (mezzo-soprano), Darren Abrahams (tenor), Paul Reeves (bass); The Opera Group; Patrick Bailey (conductor). Label: New Music Classics.
