= Elliot Wilson =

English cricketer

Personal information
- Full name: Elliot James Wilson
- Born: 10 November 1979 (age 47); Hertford, Hertfordshire, England
- Batting: Right-handed
- Bowling: Right arm medium pace
- Role: Bowler

Domestic team information
- Years: Team
- 2000–2008: Lincolnshire
- LA debut: 29 May 2002 Warwickshire Cricket Board v Leicestershire
- Last LA: 5 May 2004 Lincolnshire v Glamorgan

Career statistics
Competition	List A
Matches	3
Runs scored	–
Batting average	–
100s/50s	–
Top score	–
Balls bowled	145
Wickets	1
Bowling average	151.00
5 wickets in innings	0
10 wickets in match	0
Best bowling	1/85
Catches/stumpings	0/–
- Source: CricketArchive, 22 July 2009

Elliot James Wilson (born 10 November 1979) is an English cricketer, born in [Merthyr Tydfil, Wales]. He represented his country in 1995 playing for the Welsh Schoolboys and then the Wales Amateur XI on five occasions in 2000. He has played three List A games, all in the C&G Trophy: one for Warwickshire Cricket Board in 2002, and two for Lincolnshire in 2003 and 2004. His only wicket at this level was that of Glamorgan's Matthew Maynard in 2004. A cherished moment capturing his boyhood hero.
