= Elliott Morris (musician) =

English singer-songwriter and guitarist

Elliott Morris from West Ashby, Lincolnshire, England, is an English singer-songwriter and guitarist, active in the UK folk and pop music scenes. He has been described as a 'fearsome young guitarist', playing a mix of folk and country, tinged with blues. According to the blog Write Wyatt UK, Morris's music "redefines folk...with a little John Martyn influence delivered in Seth Lakeman style"

He has completed two UK tours supporting Paul Carrack (Squeeze, Mike and the Mechanics, Eric Clapton) including dates at Glasgow Royal Concert Hall, Sage, Gateshead and the London Palladium.

Morris has also supported artists such as Andy McKee, Frank Turner, Seth Lakeman, Lau, Big Country, Martin Carthy and Dave Swarbrick. He has been joined on stage a number of times by Ed Sheeran, Alan Thomson (John Martyn Band), Mike Vass and Innes Watson and even YouTube comedy sensation, Slomozovo – Chris ‘Bing’ Bingham.

== Performances and style ==
The Worthing Herald said of Morris's performance at the Pavilion Theatre "Elliott Morris absorbingly entertains and amuses with genuine guitar wizardry, tenor voice, sometimes both together, observant and wry lyrics, and some fun anecdotes and audience teasing."

The Swindon Advertiser said "His mastery of guitar earned him his place on stage and his slap guitar was entertaining as well as skilful. One to watch."

Morris has regularly appeared at the Cambridge Folk Festival, including a slot on Brian MacNeill's Saturday Stage 2 session in 2014. About Morris' performance, McNeill said "As the guy who has had the honour, for many years now, to present Cambridge Folk Festival’s Saturday afternoon Stage 2 Session, I regularly get to see the cream of the international folk scene. In 2014, Elliott Morris walked on and quite simply, stole the show. Go and see him, now."

Elliott has also played at festivals including numerous slots at Celtic Connections, Glasgow in 2013, 2014 and 2015, and previous summer festivals include Barking Folk Festival, Hop Farm Festival, Towersey Folk Festival, Warwick Folk Festival, Beverley Folk Festival, London Acoustic Guitar Show and Ullapool Guitar Festival.

His guitar playing is influenced by Michael Hedges and Eric Roche, and entails tapping, slapping, strumming and fretting and playing his guitar all at the same time.

== Releases ==
Elliott has self-released a number of solo EPs, the most recently being It Seemed to Make Sense at the Time.

Bluesdoodles reviewed the EP and gave it a 7/10, saying 'Elliott Morris is a young man with energy and fizz who loves and believes in the quality music he is producing so sit back listen enjoy and go see him live. Elliott has loads of potential as a musician who plays and sings well but above that he entertains you.'

"Let It Out" from the EP was included on Tom Robinson's BBC 6 Music Introducing Mixtape on 2 February 2015.

== See also ==
- Percussive guitar
