= Tom Wiggall =

British composer

Tom Wiggall is a British composer who writes music for film and for the stage. He has taught composition in the University of Birmingham, Birmingham Conservatoire and Birkbeck, University of London, the Royal College of Music, North London Collegiate School, Surbiton High School and Highgate School. Tom was also the Director of Music at Brighton College. He is currently the Director of Music at Harrow International School Hong Kong.

Wiggall's work includes Alban, a community opera commissioned by St Albans Cathedral Music Trust and premiered in May 2009. He has composed an anthem for Southwell Minster and the title music for Faith in the Frame, a television series by Melvyn Bragg for ITV1. He has composed for many theatre projects and made arrangements for BBC Two's Friday Night is Music Night. Other work includes: 'Hic est enim', an Advent carol commissioned for Harrow School's 2011 Nine Lessons and Carols; 'Gloria' and 'Amor nos Semper Ducat', works for the combined choirs of Surbiton High School; music for IBM's recent X-force viral advertising campaign.

In recent years Tom has also composed for independent film and theatre projects, having his music played in venues including the Riverside Studios, The Soho Curzon, The Criterion Theatre and the Royal Opera House. His work for TV and radio includes music for Channel 4's 'The Art Show' documentary series and arrangements for BBC2's 'Friday Night is Music Night'.
