= Elliott R. Brown =

American academic

Elliott R. Brown from the University of California, Los Angeles, was awarded the status of Fellow in the American Physical Society, after they were nominated by their Forum on Industrial and Applied Physics in 2007, for breakthroughs in THz science and technology including new solid-state coherent sources: (1) resonant-tunneling oscillators, and (2) photomixers; new detectors based on single-crystal, semimetal-semiconductor junctions; and high-resolution spectroscopy of solids.

== See also ==
- List of fellows of the American Physical Society (1998–2010)
