= Ruth Ojadi =

British singer-songwriter (born 1986)

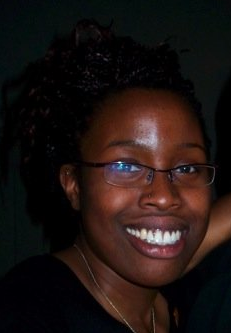
- Ruth Ojadi in 2009

Background information
- Born: 17 October 1986 (age 39); Crouch End, North London, England
- Genres: Jazz
- Occupations: Singer, songwriter
- Years active: 2005–present

Ruth O. Ojadi (born 17 October 1986) is a British singer-songwriter who appeared in BBC's documentary, Tourettes: I Swear I Can Sing. She attended Middlesex University in 2006 but dropped out after two years due to her Tourette syndrome. She also appeared in the Channel 4 show The Undateables and is bisexual.

== Early life ==
She was born in Crouch End, North London, to Nigerian parents. Her father went back to Nigeria when she was two.
