= Elliotte Rusty Harold =

Elliotte Rusty Harold (born ca. 1960) is an American computer scientist, lecturer and author of several books on Java and XML and the creator of XOM, an open source Java class library for processing XML data.

== Life and work ==
Harold was born and raised in New Orleans, where his father Elliotte Harold Jr. was working as lawyer.

In a bio for an IBM DeveloperWorks article written by Harold, he claimed to have learned 14 computer programming languages, beginning with Fortran and AppleSoft BASIC and extending most recently to Haskell. "Java was probably his eighth language, and the one he's taken farther than any other," the bio states.

Harold was an adjunct professor in the Computer Science Department of Polytechnic University of New York. He is the longtime publisher of the Cafe au Lait and Cafe con Leche websites devoted to Java and XML, respectively. He was a contributor to JDOM, a popular open source XML library for Java. At the New York XML SIG in 2002, he unveiled XOM and offered this explanation for its creation: "XOM is based on more than two years' experience with JDOM development, as well as the last year's effort writing Processing XML with Java. While documenting the various APIs I found lots of things to like and not like about all the APIs, and XOM is my effort to synthesize the best features of the existing APIs while eliminating the worst."

== Selected publications ==
- Java Developer's Resource (Prentice Hall, 1996), ISBN 0-13-570789-7
- Java Secrets (Wiley, 1997), ISBN 0-7645-8007-8
- JavaBeans: Developing Component Software in Java (John Wiley & Sons, 1997), ISBN 0-7645-8052-3
- XML: Extensible Markup Language (Wiley, 1998), ISBN 0-7645-3199-9
- Java I/O, First Edition (O'Reilly, 1999), ISBN 1-56592-485-1
- Processing XML with Java : a guide to SAX, DOM, JDOM, JAXP, and TrAX (Addison-Wesley, 2002), ISBN 0-201-77186-1
- Effective XML: 50 specific ways to improve your XML (Addison-Wesley, 2003), ISBN 0-321-15040-6
- The XML Bible (Wiley, 2004), ISBN 0-7645-4986-3
- XML in a Nutshell (O'Reilly, 2004), ISBN 0-596-00764-7
- Java Network Programming, Third Edition (O'Reilly, 2004), ISBN 0-596-00721-3
- Java I/O, Second Edition (O'Reilly, 2006), ISBN 0-596-52750-0
- Refactoring HTML: Improving the Design of Existing Web Applications (Addison-Wesley Professional, 2012), ISBN 0-321-50363-5
- Java Network Programming, Fourth Edition (O'Reilly, 2013), ISBN 1-449-35767-9
