= Elliot (surname) =

Elliot is a surname, and may refer to:

== A ==
- Adam Elliot (born 1972), Australian animator
- Adam Elliot (missionary) (1802–1878), Canadian missionary
- Adam Elliot (traveller) (died 1700), English explorer implicated in the Popish plot
- Alec Elliot (born 1996), Canadian paralympic swimmer
- Alexander Elliot (actor) (born 2004), Canadian television actor
- Alexander Elliot (British Army officer) (1825–1909), British Major-General
- Alison Elliot (born 1948), Scottish psychologist and 2004 Moderator of the General Assembly of the Church of Scotland
- Alistair Elliot (1932–2018), British poet and translator
- Allan Elliot (1906−1973), New Zealand athlete
- Alonzo Elliot (1891–1964), American composer and songwriter
- Andrew Elliot (1728–1797), British merchant and final Governor of New York
- Andrew J. Elliot (born 1962), American social psychologist
- Ann Elliot (1743–1769), British actress and courtesan
- Annabel Elliot (born 1949), British interior designer and antiques dealer
- Anne Elliot (novelist) (1856–1941), English writer
- Archibald Elliot (1761–1823), Scottish architect
- Arthur Elliot (artist) (1809–1892), British artist
- Arthur Elliot (politician) (1846–1923), Scottish journalist and politician
- Arthur J. Elliot II (1933–1968), American naval officer

== B ==
- Barry Elliot (footballer) (born 1978), English footballer
- Ben Elliot (born 1975), British businessman
- Biff Elliot (1923–2012), American actor
- Billy Elliot (jockey) (died 1941), Australian jockey
- Billy Elliot (RHC) (c. 1964–1995), Northern Irish Loyalist
- Billy Elliot (UDA), Northern Irish Loyalist
- Brendan Elliot (born 1994), Australian rugby league footballer
- Brian Elliot (born 1981), American social entrepreneur

== C ==
- Callan Elliot (born 1999), New Zealand footballer
- Calum Elliot (born 1987) is a Scottish footballer and manager
- Carma Elliot (Caroline Margaret Elliot, born 1964), British diplomat
- Cass Elliot (1941–1974), American singer
- Charles Elliot (1801–1875), British Royal Navy officer, diplomat and colonial administrator
- Charles Elliot (Royal Navy officer, born 1818) (1818–1895), Royal Navy officer
- Lady Charlotte Elliot (1839–1880), Scottish poet
- Chris Elliot, Royal Air Force officer
- Christy Elliot (1933–2020), Scottish rugby union footballer

== D ==
- Daniel Giraud Elliot (1835–1915), American zoologist
- David Elliot (actor) (born 1981), Scottish actor
- David Elliot (footballer) (born 1969), Scottish footballer
- David Elliot (illustrator) (born 1952), New Zealand illustrator and author
- Denny Elliot (1914–1998), American basketball player
- Desmond Elliot (born 1974), Nigerian actor, film director and politician
- Don Elliot (rower) (born 1929), English rower
- Doug Elliot (politician) (1917–1989), Australian politician
- Douglas Elliot (1923–2005), Scottish rugby union footballer
- Duncan Elliot (1862–1919), American banker and soldier

== E ==
- Edgar Elliot (1878–1931), English cricketer and rugby union footballer
- Edmund Elliot (1854–1926), British Army officer and courtier
- Edward Elliot (architect) (1828–1901), Canadian architect
- Edward Elliot (judge) (died 1866), judge in colonial Madras
- Edward Hay Mackenzie Elliot (1852–1921), Scottish soldier and footballer
- Edward Locke Elliot (1850–1938), British Army officer in India
- Edward Elliot-Square (born 1978), English cricketer
- Elisabeth Elliot (1926–2015), American Christian missionary, wife of Jim Elliot
- Elliot Engel, American writer

== F ==
- Fiona Elliot, English table tennis player
- Frances Minto Elliot (1820–1898), English travel writer and social historian
- Francis Elliot (1851–1940), British diplomat, envoy to Greece

== G ==
- George Elliot (Royal Navy officer, born 1784) (1784–1863), British naval officer and Member of Parliament
- George Elliot (Royal Navy officer, born 1813) (1813–1901), British naval officer and Member of Parliament
- George Elliot (rugby league) (born 1991), English rugby league footballer
- Sir George Elliot, 1st Baronet (1814–1893), British businessman and Member of Parliament
- Sir George Elliot, 2nd Baronet (1844–1895), British businessman and Member of Parliament
- Gilbert Elliot (priest) (1800–1891), British Anglican priest, Dean of Bristol
- Sir Gilbert Elliot, 1st Baronet, of Minto (c.1650–1718), Member of the Parliament of Scotland, judge of the Court of Session as Lord Minto
- Sir Gilbert Elliot, 2nd Baronet, of Minto (c.1693–1766), Scottish Member of Parliament and judge
- Sir Gilbert Elliot, 3rd Baronet, of Minto (1722–1777), Scottish politician, philosopher and poet
- Graham Elliot (born 1977), American chef

== H ==
- Harry Elliot (1920–2009), British physicist and space scientist
- Helen Elliot (1927–2013), Scottish table tennis player
- Henry Elliot (1817–1907), British diplomat
- Henry George Elliot (1826–1912), Canadian-born soldier and administrator
- Henry Miers Elliot (1808–1853), English civil servant and historian in India
- Hika Elliot (born 1986), New Zealand rugby union footballer
- Hugh Elliot (1752–1830), British diplomat and colonial governor
- Hugh Elliot (MP) (1848–1932), British politician

== I ==
- Ian Elliot (1946–2021), Scottish artist
- Isac Elliot (born 2000), Finnish-Swedish singer-songwriter and actor
- Isobel Elliot (c.1651–1678), Scottish woman accused of witchcraft and burnt

== J ==
- James Elliot (politician) (1775–1839), American soldier, lawyer, author and politician
- James L. Elliot (1943–2011), American astronomer
- James Elliot-Square (born 1983), English cricketer
- Jane Elliot (born 1947), American actress
- Jane Evans Elliot (1820–1886), American Civil War memoirist
- Jason Elliot (born 1965), British travel writer and novelist
- Jean Elliot (1727–1805), Scottish poet, wrote "Flowers of the Forest"
- Jim Elliot (1927–1956), American missionary
- John Elliot (antiquary) (1725–1782), English antiquarian
- John Elliot (author) (1918–1997), British novelist, screenwriter and television producer
- John Elliot (brewer) (1765–1829), English brewer and officer of the Westminster Volunteer Cavalry
- John Elliot (physician) (1747–1787), English physician and scientist
- John Elliot (railway manager) (1898–1988), British transport and railway manager
- John Elliot (Roxburghshire MP) (1788–1862), British politician
- John Elliot (Royal Navy officer) (1732–1808), Royal Navy admiral, politician and governor of Newfoundland
- John Elliot (songwriter) (1914–1972), American songwriter
- Jonathan Elliot (publisher) (1784–1846), American publisher
- Justine Elliot (born 1967), Australian politician

== K ==
- Karen Elliot, American tennis coach
- Katharine Elliot, Baroness Elliot of Harwood (1903–1994), British public servant and politician

== L ==
- Larry Elliot (born 1938), American baseball player
- Launceston Elliot (1874–1930), British weightlifter
- Luke Elliot (born 1984), American musician, producer and actor

== M ==
- Madge Elliot (activist) (1928–2024), Scottish rail activist
- Marc Elliot (born 1986), American author
- Mark Elliot (radio host) (1953–2019), Canadian broadcaster
- Mary E. Elliot (1851–1942), American writer and lecturer
- Mattha Elliot (1870–1945), Scottish rugby union footballer
- Michael Elliott (chemist) (1924–2007), British chemist
- Michael Elliott (director) (1931–1984), English director
- Michael Elliott (politician) (born 1932), British politician, MEP in European Parliament election, 1999 (United Kingdom)
- Michael A. Elliott, American literary scholar, president of Amherst College
- Michael J. Elliott (1951–2016), journalist and CEO of the anti-poverty advocacy organization ONE

== N ==
- Nathaniel Elliot (1705–1780), English Jesuit scholar

== O ==
- Oliver Elliot (born 1987), Chilean freestyle swimmer

== P ==
- Peter Elliot (born 1966), American writer

== R ==
- Raymond Elliot, American football coach
- Richard Elliot (born 1960), American saxophonist
- Rob Elliot (born 1986), English football goalkeeper
- Robert Elliot (Royal Navy officer) (1790–1849), English naval officer and topographical draughtsman
- Robert Elliot (surgeon) (1864–1936), British ophthalmic surgeon and author
- Robert Henry Elliot (1837–1914), Scottish agriculturalist and writer
- Rona Elliot (born 1947), American music journalist
- Ronald Elliot-Wilson (1907–1954), South African cricketer
- Rose Elliot (born 1945), British vegetarian cookery writer

== S ==
- Sandy Elliot (died 2015), Canadian drag racer
- Sten Elliot (1925–2022), Swedish competitive sailor
- Stro Elliot, American record producer and multi-instrumentalist
- Su Elliot (born 1950), British actress

== T ==
- Tevin Elliot (born 1991), American football player and convicted rapist
- Thomas Elliot (footballer) (born 1979), Caymanian footballer
- Thomas Elliot (organ builder) (1759–1832), English organ builder
- Tom Elliot (1926–1998), Scotland rugby union footballer
- Tom Elliot (rugby union, born 1880) (1880–1948), Scotland rugby union footballer
- Tommy Elliot (born 1941), Scotland rugby union footballer
- Tucker Elliot, American sportswriter and author

== W ==
- Walt Elliot (1933–2020), Ontario politician
- Walter Elliot (English politician) (1910–1988), British Member of Parliament
- Walter Elliot (naturalist) (1803–1887), Scottish Indian civil servant and naturalist
- Walter Elliot (Scottish politician) (1888–1958), British Member of Parliament
- Walter John Elliot (1914–1979), Canadian Surgeon General
- Willard Elliot (1926–2000), American bassoonist and composer
- William Elliot of Wells (1701–64), English army officer, courtier and Member of Parliament
- William Elliot (Irish politician) (1766–1818), Member of the Irish Parliament and Chief Secretary for Ireland
- William Elliot (RAF officer) (1896–1971), Royal Air Force commander
- William Elliot (rugby union) (1867–1958), New Zealand rugby union footballer
- Win Elliot (1915–1998), American sportscaster

== See also ==
- Elliot-Murray-Kynynmound
- Scott-Elliot
- Eliot (surname)
- Elliot
- Eliott (surname)
