= Arthur Elliot =

Arthur Elliot or Elliott may refer to:

- Arthur Elliot (artist) (1809–1892), British artist
- Arthur Elliot (politician) (1846–1923), Scottish Liberal Unionist politician
- Arthur Elliott (photographer) (1870–1938), South African photographer
- Arthur G. Elliott Jr. (1916–2003), American politician from the state of Michigan
- Arthur Elliott (footballer) (1870–?), English footballer
- Arthur J. Elliot II (1933–1968), American naval officer
