= Adam Elliot (disambiguation) =

Adam Elliot is an Australian writer, animator and director.

Adam Elliot may also refer to:

- Adam Elliot (traveller) (died 1700), English explorer implicated in the Popish plot
- Adam Elliot (missionary) (1802–1878), Canadian missionary

== See also ==
- Adam Elliott (born 1994), Australian rugby league footballer
