= James Lambert (painter) =

English artist

James Lambert (1725 – 7 December 1788) was an English artist, painting scenery and views of historic buildings near Lewes in Sussex where he lived. He was also a musician.

== Life ==
Lambert was born in Jevington in Sussex, and baptised on 29 December 1725. He the youngest of eight children of John Lambert, a flax dresser, and his wife Susan Bray. The family moved to Cliffe, near Lewes, about 1730. He received little education. He received some instruction in music; from 1745 until his death he was the organist of the church of St Thomas-at-Cliffe, and he published volumes of psalms and hymns. He was known in Lewes as a "herald painter", and painted many inn signs. In 1760 at Stopham he married Mary Winton (1736–1810); they had one child, who died in infancy.

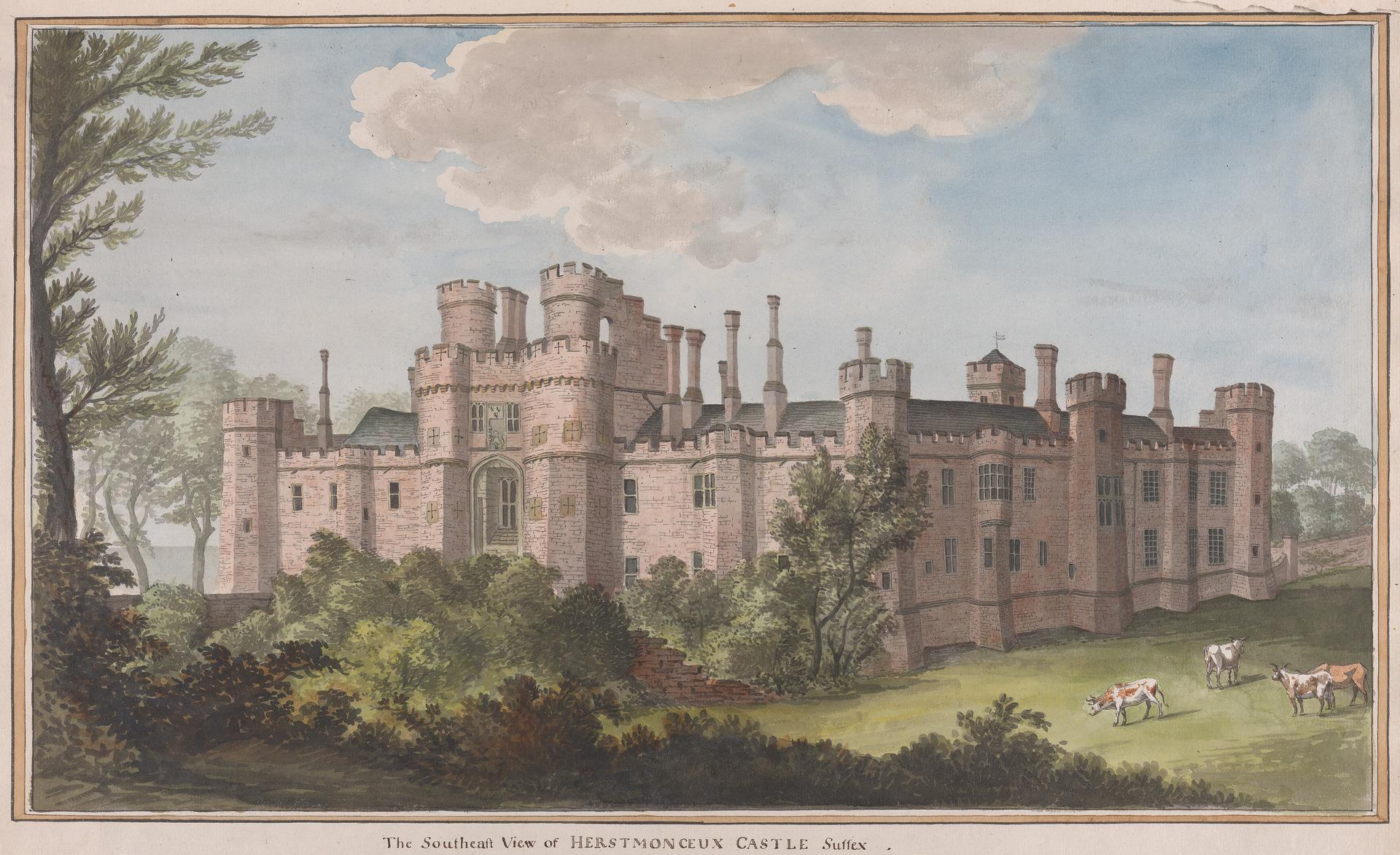
Herstmonceux Castle: graphite and watercolour by James Lambert

He is thought to have had some instruction in landscape painting from George Smith, a distant relative. He exhibited at the Free Society of Artists and the Royal Academy of Art between 1768 and 1778. From about 1772 he produced watercolours showing historic buildings, some commissioned by local gentry. He was assisted by his nephew James Lambert (1741–1799). He produced a series of several hundred watercolour drawings for Sir William Burrell, illustrating the antiquities of Sussex. John Elliot also requested views of antiquities. Other drawings by Lambert are in John Watson's History of the Earls of Warren and in the works of Thomas Walker Horsfield.

Paul Dunvan, in his History of Lewes (p. 324), says that Lambert was a better painter than musician, though excellent in both arts. He died in Lewes on 7 December 1788, aged 63, and was buried in the churchyard of St John sub Castro.
