= Philip Alphonse Dur =

US Navy admiral (born 1944)

- Born: June 22, 1944 (age 82); Bethesda, Maryland
- Military career
- Allegiance: United States of America
- Service years: 1965–1995
- Rank: Rear admiral
- Unit: United States Navy
- Commands: Cruiser Destroyer Group Eight, Saratoga Battle Group, USS Yorktown (CG-48), USS Comte De Grasse (DD-974)

Philip Alphonse Dur (born June 22, 1944) is a retired US Navy rear admiral. Dur served as the Assistant Deputy Chief of Naval Operations, Plans, Policy and Operations before retiring in May 1995.

== Early life and education ==
Dur was born on June 22, 1944, in Bethesda, Maryland, to an American diplomat. He spent his early years abroad in France, Germany, Panama, and Japan, accompanying his parents on foreign assignments.

Dur attended the University of Notre Dame as an NROTC student majoring in Government and International Studies. He received a BA in 1965 and an MA focusing on Soviet East European Studies in 1966. After receiving a Littauer Fellowship, he completed a master's degree in Public Administration at the Kennedy School of Government in 1973, and he received the PhD in Political Economy and Government from the Graduate School of Arts and Sciences at Harvard University in 1976.

== Career ==
Dur's first assignment at sea was as a radio officer and OC Division officer in the USS Little Rock (CLG-4), homeported in Greta, Italy. He was subsequently assigned as the Assistant Fleet Scheduler on the Staff of the Commander Sixth Fleet. Upon completion of studies at the Naval Destroyer School, where he earned the Arleigh Burke Leadership Award, he was assigned as Operations Officer in USS Knox (DE-1052) and deployed twice to the combat theater in the western Pacific. In 1975, he was appointed executive officer in the USS Waddell (DDG-24), deploying to the Western Pacific. In 1980, Commander Dur assumed command of the USS Comte DeGrasse (DD-974) while the ship was deployed to the Mediterranean. While in command, the ship participated with the Eisenhower Battlegroup in the major fleet exercise, Ocean Venture, in the North Atlantic and deployed again to the Mediterranean during the Libyan crisis of 1982. In 1986, he took command of the second Aegis Cruiser, USS Yorktown (CG-48). In February 1988, while deployed in the Mediterranean and Black Sea, Yorktown was rammed by a Soviet destroyer in what has been termed the last incident of the Cold War. The ship earned the Battle Efficiency "E" for Cruiser Destroyer Group Eight in 1987. Dur's last sea assignment in 1992-1993 was as commander of Cruiser Destroyer Group Eight, responsible for the surface combatants homeported in Norfolk, Virginia, and as the Commander of the Saratoga Battlegroup The Battlegroup deployed to the Sixth Fleet in the Mediterranean and was the first to be deployed in the Adriatic Sea during the Yugoslav crisis of 1993.

He served successive tours in the Office of the Chief of Naval Operations (OP-06), where he was a founding member of the Strategy and Concepts branch in 1978. In 1979, he was assigned to the Office of the Secretary of Defense (Policy) in the Planning and Requirements Division. Following command of USS Comte De Grasse, he was assigned to the staff of the National Security Council as a director of Political-Military Affairs. In that assignment, he also served as military assistant to the President's Special Envoys to the Middle East. In 1988, Dur was ordered as executive assistant and senior Naval Aide to the Secretary of the Navy. Following his selection to Flag rank, he was appointed as the US Defense Attache to France. In 1993, he returned to Washington as director of the Naval Strategy Division and subsequently as the ADCNO Plans, Policy, and Operations (N3B/5B).

== Publication ==
Dur published his autobiography Between Land and Sea: A Cold Warrior's Log in 2022. The book focuses on his assignments, educational opportunities, and challenges at sea during the Cold War.

=== Military ===
- Defense Distinguished Service Medal (1993)
- Distinguished Service Medal (1995)
- Defense Superior Service Medal (1980) (1984)
- x2 Legion of Merit (1988) (1989)
- x3 Meritorious Service Medal (1978) (1981) (1982)
- Combat Action Ribbon (1984)
- Inducted into the Defense Attache Hall of Fame by the Defense Intelligence Agency (1991)
- French Ordre national du Mérite in the grade of Commandeur (1993)

=== Civilian ===
- Littauer Fellow at Harvard University (1973)
- US member of the French Academie de Marine appointed by President François Mitterrand (1998)
- Hispanic Engineer of the Year (2004)
- Albert Nelson Marquis Lifetime Achievement Award by Marquis Who's Who (2020)
- Member of The Constellation Program by United States Navy Memorial (2023)
