= Brian Elliot =

American social entrepreneur

- Born: 1981 (age 44–45); St. Louis, Missouri
- Education: Harvard Business School, Harvard Kennedy School, Stanford University,
- Occupation: Founder of Friendfactor

Brian Elliot (born 1981) is an American social entrepreneur and speaker on technology, innovation, and social impact.

Elliot co-founded Camp Kesem, and he is the founder of Friendfactor, an LGBT rights nonprofit that helps straight supporters become visible, vocal, and active allies in their communities. Friendfactor created a widely used online advocacy tool that was deployed in the historic campaign for marriage equality in New York in 2011.

== Background ==
Elliot was born in St. Louis, Missouri. He received his first grant at the age of 13 to start a program called the Achievement Forest. He later gained national recognition for starting a program in high school called DeafLink, which connected hearing high school students with deaf middle schoolers.

Elliot received his B.A. in public policy at Stanford University, where he continued helping build and lead social ventures. He was the student co-founder of Camp Kesem, a free college student run summer camp for children whose parents have or had cancer. He became a founding board member of Camp Kesem National, which replicated the Camp Kesem model at over 40 colleges and universities across the United States.

Elliot began his career in management consulting and then received his M.B.A and M.P.A from Harvard University where he was both a Zuckerman Fellow and a George Fellow.

In 2009, he started Friendfactor, an LGBT rights nonprofit that helps straight supporters become visible, vocal, and active allies in their communities. Friendfactor created and launched an innovative online advocacy tool that engaged thousands of New Yorkers to contact their state representatives in support of their gay friends' equal rights. Chelsea Clinton launched the online tool at an event in New York City.

== Awards and honors ==
Elliot's work to start Friendfactor was named one of the Top 10 Inspiring Acts of 2010 by Yahoo! News. He was also named a 30 under 30 Civic Leader by Splashlife, a 36 Under 36 Leader by the Jewish Week, and he was a recipient of the SXSW Dewey Winburne Community Service Award in 2012.

Elliot was named the 2010 Harvard Business School Social Entrepreneurship Fellow and was honored by Auburn Seminary in 2011 as a millennial leader. He was named a PopTech Fellow in 2010.

== Publications ==
Elliot has been published on topic of entrepreneurship and international development in the Harvard Business School case study entitled "Endeavor: Creating a Movement for High-Impact Entrepreneurship." He has also co-authored the first piece in Harvard Business Review to address transgender issues in the workplace, in an article entitled, "When Steve Becomes Stephanie."

== Public Speaking ==
Elliot is a frequent speaker and panelist on topics involving social innovation, technology, digital media, and authentic leadership. He has been a keynote speaker at the Millennial Impact Conference, the Reaching Out MBA Conference, and the JFNA Leadership Conference. Elliot has also spoken at the Harvard Social Enterprise Conference, the PopTech 2010 Conference as a Social Innovation Fellow, the Schusterman NetWORKS Gathering, Unreasonable@State, and the Founder Institute.
