= Butterfly Trek Madone =

Artwork

The Butterfly Trek Madone, an artwork utilizing a bicycle by Damien Hirst, became the world's most expensive bicycle when it was bought at auction for $500,000. It was designed by Hirst, who used real butterfly wings that were placed onto the actual frame and wheels of the bicycle. The bike had been ridden by Lance Armstrong in the 2009 Tour de France.

== About ==
The Butterfly Trek Madone currently holds the title of the most expensive bike sold in the world. The second most expensive bike ever sold was the Trek Yoshitomo Nara Speed Concept that was sold for $200,000. Since the Butterfly Trek Madone utilized the beauty of natural wings taken from butterflies, it was predicted that PETA was highly opposed to this art piece. There were also animal rights activists that called Hirst's bike art "barbaric." The original release of the bike was in July 2009 before the actual auction. The original concept was in honor of Lance Armstrong's return to cycling.

== Auction ==
Butterfly Trek Madone was auctioned at Sotheby's for the Livestrong Foundation. Armstrong's excitement was evident on Twitter when he tweeted during the auction that the bike had gone "for 500,000.00!!! Half a million bucks!!!" The event that the Butterfly Trek Madone was being presented at was the "It's About the Bike" auction held on 1 November 2009 in New York City. The auction was held to raise money and benefit the Lance Armstrong Foundation's cancer research, awareness, and advocacy. At the auction a total of $1.25 million that was raised. There were about 20 renowned artists that were asked to utilize their expertise to create unique artwork to be showcased and ultimately auctioned off. It ended up being Hirst's Butterfly Trek Madone that sold for $500,000.00.
