= Jackie Wong =

Figure skating analyst (b.1982)

- Born: April 11, 1982 (age 44); British Hong Kong
- Education: Stanford University (BA); University of Pennsylvania (MArch, MBA)
- Occupation: McKinsey & Company consultant
- Years active: 2009-present

Jackie Wong (born April 11, 1982) is a figure skating analyst. He blogs, tweets and sells merchandise as Rocker Skating as well as hosting the Ice Talk podcast at Ice Network. He is based in New York.

Wong is a board member at Reaching Out MBA, has worked for architectural firm Skidmore, Owings & Merrill, and was an associate partner at McKinsey & Company. A former novice skater who has passed the U.S. Figure Skating juvenile tests and worked as a coach and a judge, he began covering figure skating for Examiner.com in 2009.

He created Rocker Skating as a graduate business school project at the University of Pennsylvania in 2015 and began attracting sponsorships. His commentary ranges from offering technical play-by-plays to sharing his opinions on a skater's choice of costumes and music. During the 2026 Winter Olympics, Wong released Rocker Skating Live Beta, a hub for competition results, live fan scoring, and ranking predictions.

Wong has a bachelor's degree in economics and urban studies from Stanford University, a Master of Architecture degree from the University of Pennsylvania School of Design and an MBA from Penn's Wharton School. He contributed to the University of Pennsylvania's biomedical research department by analyzing the movement and positions of the arms, legs and head of ice skaters and presenting them as 3D models. He was selected to compete in Season 36 of "Jeopardy!" and came in second place on the episode that aired May 19, 2020.
