= Isobel Elliot =

- Born: c. 1651
- Died: 20 September 1678; Peaston
- Cause of death: Strangled and Burnt
- Known for: Accused witch

Isobel Elliot (c. 1651 – 1678), sometimes called Isobell Eliot, was a woman accused of witchcraft from Peaston, near Ormiston in East Lothian. She was tried as a witch in Edinburgh during 1678, and executed on 20 September 1678 at Peaston by being strangled and burnt at the stake.

At her time of death, Elliot was thought to have been around 27 years old. She was the servant of Helen Laying, another accused witch, and of lower socioeconomic status. Not much is known about Elliot 's relationship or marital status.

== Trial and confession ==
Elliot was accused of entering into a pact with the Devil after she lay or had sex with the Devil and renounced her baptism. After she was baptised she was given a new name, 'Jean'. She was accused of killing the daughter and grandson of two local women. She allegedly had done this by flying in the form of a bee, carrying poison in her claws and wings, which identified her as a follower of rebel East Lothian minister, Gideon Penman. Elliot confessed to the minister of Ormiston, John Sinclair, that many nights she and other witches had wanted to get inside his house and yard, but the Devil had told her that he could not be attacked.

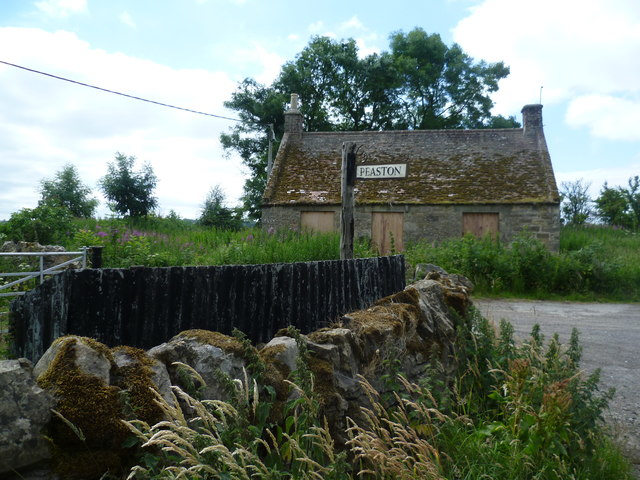
Peaston village, near Ormiston in East Lothian.

Members of the local nobility and community requested permission to hold a local trial for Elliot in 1678, which was refused. However, it was eventually escalated to a central trial, in Edinburgh. There were three trials recorded for Elliot, taking place in June and September 1678 with a confession being obtained on the 13 September. Elliot was probably tried with seven to nine other witches accused in and around East Lothian in 1678. Sir John Nicolson, John Clerk of Penicuik, John Johnston of Polton, and John Preston (relation to the Prestons of Craigmillar Castle) were commissioners in her trial.

== Death and legacy ==
Elliot was among the four supposed witches, out of the thirteen sentenced, who were taken to Peaston to be executed. She was strangled and burnt to death on 20 September 1678.

There has been speculation as to whether Isabel Heriot, a woman who was born in Ormiston in the same period and mythologised as a poltergeist in George Sinclair's Satan's Invisible World Discovered, was the same person as Elliot. However, this is unlikely as Heriot was never recorded as being considered a witch by her contemporaries, unlike Elliot.
