= Livestrong Foundation =

Supports people affected by cancer

- Logo used since January 2024
- Founded: 1997
- Founder: Lance Armstrong
- Location: Austin, Texas
- Region served: United States
- Key people: Suzanne Stone (President)
- Website: livestrong.org

The Livestrong Foundation is a United States nonprofit organization that provides support for people affected by cancer. The foundation, based in Austin, Texas, was established in 1997 by cancer survivor and former professional road racing cyclist Lance Armstrong, as the Lance Armstrong Foundation. The Livestrong brand was launched by the foundation in 2003. Armstrong resigned from the foundation in 2012 after his admission of doping, leading to the rebranding of the entire organization as Livestrong Foundation.

Among its activities, the foundation lobbies governmental agencies, conducts research on cancer survivors, and funds a number of smaller non-profit organizations. The cornerstone of the foundation's work was the providing of free, direct, personalized support services for people navigating the physical, practical, emotional and financial challenges of having cancer. In this effort, the foundation aimed to make the cancer care system more patient-focused. As of 2020, the foundation has shifted its focus away from "direct services", and has positioned itself as a backer of companies involved in improving patient care.

== History ==
The foundation states that its mission is "to improve the lives of cancer survivors and those affected by cancer." The foundation implements its mission through direct services, community programs and systemic change. As early as 1999, the foundation began focusing on the field of cancer survivorship, specifically the practical, psycho-social needs of cancer patients and those affected by cancer. In 2000, the foundation funded cancer survivorship programs at Children's Medical Center in Ft. Worth, TX and the University of Pennsylvania in Philadelphia, PA.

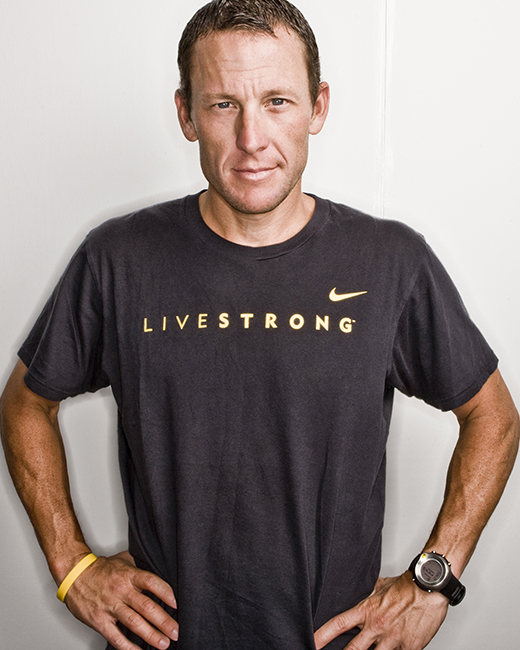
Lance Armstrong in 2008

In 2001, the foundation awarded its first community program grant through a program that would ultimately become the Community Impact Project. The first grant was awarded to Wonders and Worries, a pilot program to help children cope when a parent has a chronic or life-threatening illness like cancer. Future recipients of the Community Impact Project include the LIVESTRONG at the YMCA, Camp Kesem, Pablove Shutterbugs, and Cancer Transitions.

In 2002, the foundation launched Livestrong Survivorcare, the predecessor to Livestrong Navigation, a free one-on-one service offering cancer navigation services to patients, caregivers, friends and family members through phone, email and online services. The foundation would ultimately open the Livestrong Cancer Navigation Center at its headquarters in Austin by 2010. Since its inception, Livestrong has served over 100,000 people through free programs and services such as emotional counseling, insurance management, clinical trial matching and guidance on treatment options.

In 2008, Demand Media reached an agreement with the foundation to license the use of the Livestrong name and mark to create a spin-off website, Livestrong.com (unconnected to Livestrong.org), a commercial health and wellness site. Demand Media hired Armstrong as a spokesman.

=== Armstrong doping scandal and rebranding ===
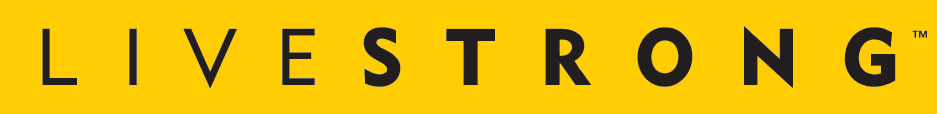
First logo, used prior to 2020.

In 2012, Armstrong was banned from professional cycling and stripped of his Tour de France titles after it was found that he had engaged in the use of performance-enhancing drugs. The foundation initially reacted by questioning the integrity of the United States Anti-Doping Agency (USADA) in a statement by president and chief executive Doug Ulman released in October 2012:

Our long-standing concerns about the impartiality and fairness of Usada's proceedings are compounded today. ... Usada appears motivated more by publicity rather than fulfilling its mission. ... Because of [Armstrong's] leadership and vision, the Lance Armstrong Foundation has served more than 2.5 million people affected by cancer over the last 15 years. ... We are deeply grateful for his leadership and incredibly proud of his achievements, both on and off the bike.

However, just a week later, Armstrong resigned as the chairman of the foundation, and from the foundation's board of directors in November. In January 2013, prior to Armstrong's televised interview with Oprah Winfrey in which he admitted to doping, the foundation released a statement that said:

We expect Lance to be completely truthful and forthcoming in his interview and with all of us in the cancer community ... Regardless, we are charting a strong, independent course forward that is focused on helping people overcome financial, emotional and physical challenges related to cancer ... Inspired by the people with cancer whom we serve, we feel confident and optimistic about the Foundation's future and welcome an end to speculation.

Following the departure of Armstrong, the foundation considered whether its highly visible brand image was a liability, linking the foundation and its activities too tightly with its founder. The conclusion was that a radical change would go against the foundation's key message: "It has never been about one person." The foundation changed its name from the Lance Armstrong Foundation to the Livestrong Foundation in November 2012. This decision and the strategy it adopted was primarily driven by the foundation's own "strong sense of itself" and the "importance of its story." In the end, in a process some critics called "subtle but substantive," the foundation's story was told through a variety of ongoing initiatives explaining the foundation's key promise, which was designed to help distinguish the organization from other organizations in the oncology community.

As a result of Armstrong's confessed guilt, on May 28, 2013, Nike announced that it would cut ties with the foundation after a nine-year relationship. After the 2013 holiday season, Nike ceased production of its Livestrong line of products, honoring its contract with the organization which expired in 2014.

The foundation was a title sponsor of Major League Soccer club Sporting Kansas City's home stadium from March 2011 to January 2013, when the naming agreement was terminated. The deal was severed after both sides blamed the other for failing to live up to their agreement; Armstrong's doping scandal was not a factor in the decision.

=== Subsequent developments ===
In 2015, Livestrong hired Chandini Portteus as their new president and CEO. She formerly worked at the Susan G. Komen Foundation.

In 2016, Portteus resigned and Greg Lee was appointed as president. Greg Lee had served as CFO of the Foundation for over ten years.

In February 2020, the foundation announced that it would change its focus to being an "impact funder" rather than a provider of direct services, backing startups involved in improving patient care. The foundation also unveiled a new logo, moving away from its previous yellow-and-black imagery (which was strongly associated with Armstrong and its wristbands). Lee stated that the new brand was intended to reflect that Livestrong was "more than a wristband". However, in January 2024, the foundation resumed the usage of yellow-and-black imagery with a revamped version of its original logo.

In 2023, Lee resigned after 17 years. Suzanne Stone was subsequently appointed as president. She formerly worked at the Children's Miracle Network Hospitals as well as the Susan G. Komen Foundation.

== Livestrong wristband ==
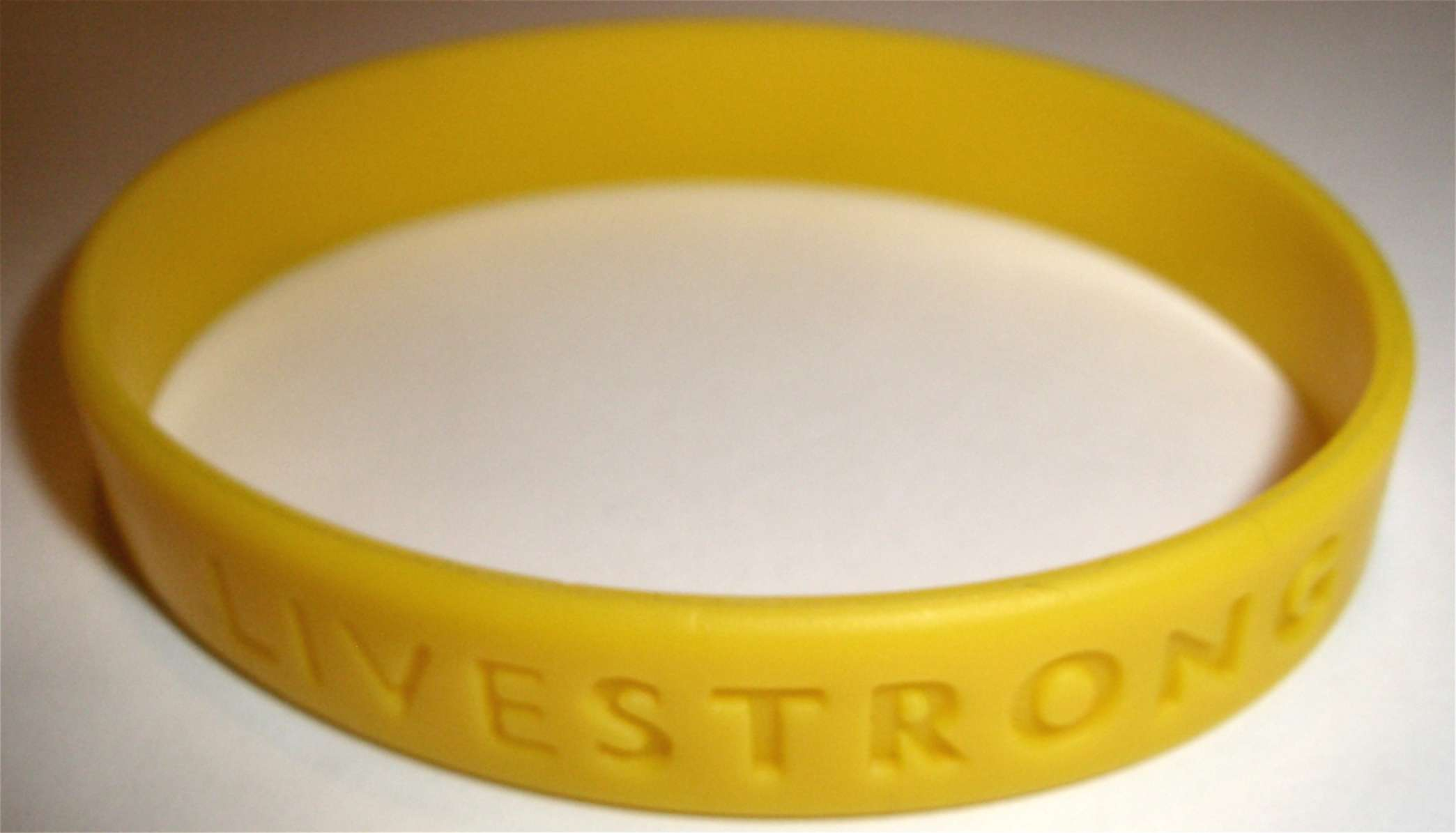
The Livestrong wristband.

The Livestrong wristband is a yellow silicone gel bracelet program launched in May 2004 as a fund-raising item. The bracelet was developed by Nike and its advertising agency, Wieden+Kennedy. The band's yellow color references the yellow jersey traditionally worn by the Tour de France's overall leader. The band became a popular fashion item in the US by the end of the summer of 2004 and appeared on a majority of the contenders at the 2004 Tour de France.

By 2013, 80 million Livestrong bracelets had been sold, according to Oprah. The success of the Livestrong bracelets led to many other charities selling similar wristbands as part of their fundraising efforts.

Following Armstrong's lifetime ban for doping by USADA, a CNN article claimed that critics had struck out the "V" or wrote a "W" over the "ST" to make the wristband read "LIE STRONG" or "LIVEWRONG". Satirical news site The Onion marketed a lookalike parody bracelet which replaced the "LIVESTRONG" text with "CHEAT TO WIN."

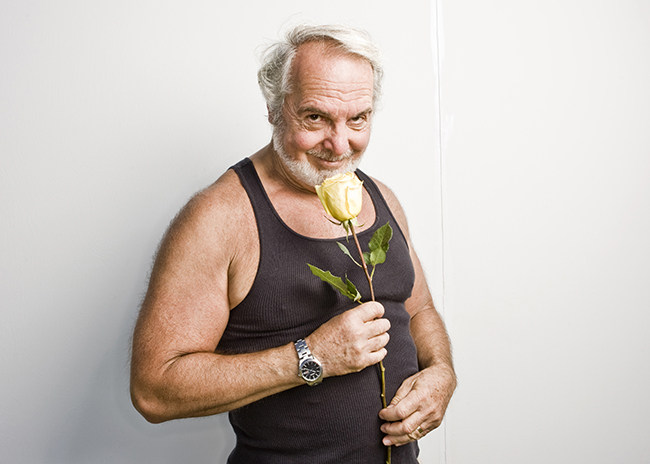

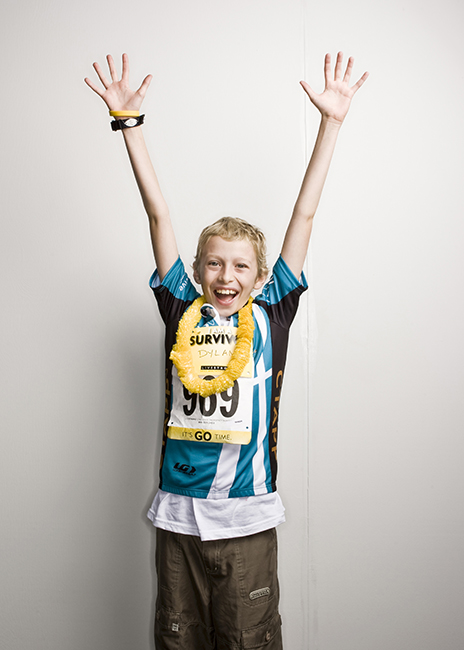

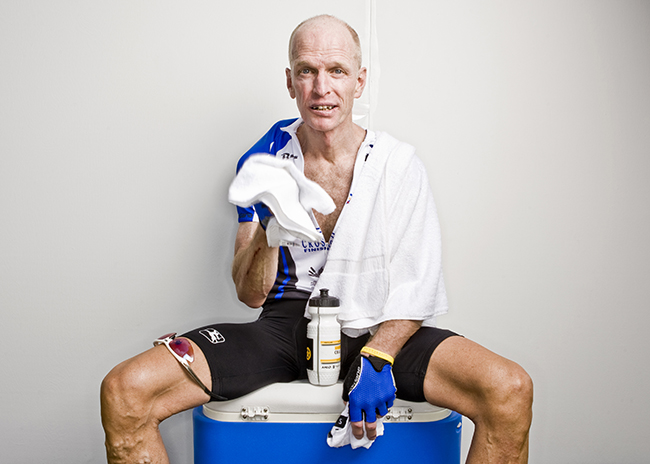

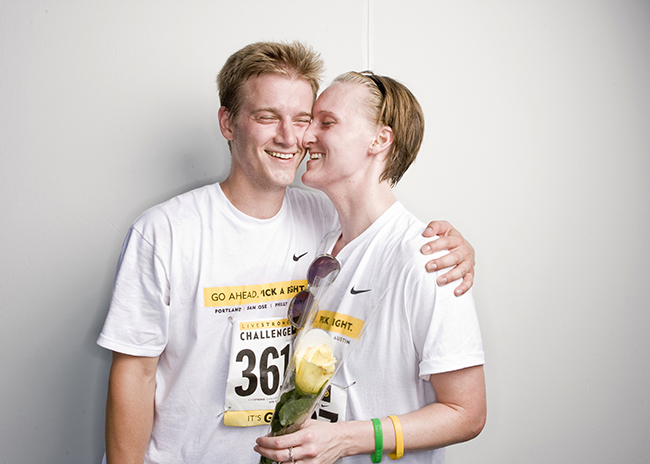

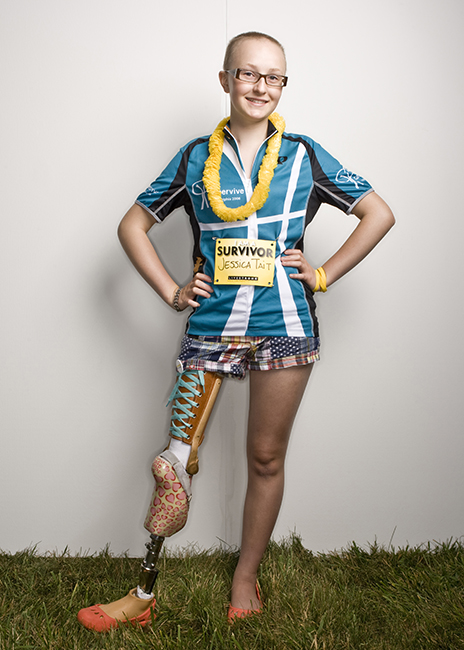

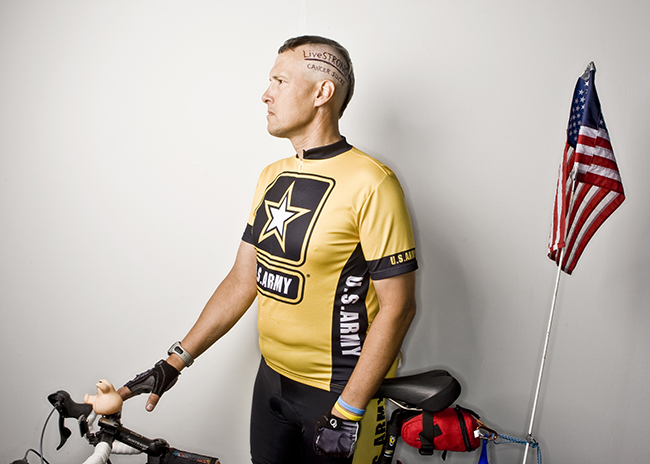

Cancer survivors wearing Livestrong wristbands in the 2008 Livestrong Challenge

== Finances ==
Despite the mounting investigation into Armstrong's doping, figures provided by the foundation to ESPN in October 2012 revealed that revenues through September were up 2.1 percent, to $33.8 million. According to ESPN, this total represented a 5.4 percent increase from 2011, with a 5.7 percent increase in the average dollar amount of those donations (from US$74.88 in 2011 to US$79.15 in 2012). Over the duration of its existence, the foundation has generated more than US$500 million worth of funds.

Since Armstrong's departure, the foundation's income has dropped. The foundation revealed that its 2013 budget was 10.9 percent less than its 2012 budget, and annual reports from the foundation show a continuous drop in revenue with annual contributions falling from $15.8 million in 2011 to $10.7 million in 2012, $7.9 million in 2013, $3.8 million in 2014, $6.7 million in 2015, $4.2 million in 2016, $3.5 million in 2017, and $3.2 million in 2018, (the last year for which audited financial reports are available). Income from licensing and royalties also declined dramatically, from a high of $7.2 million in 2007 to a low of $13,875 in 2017.
