= Andy Sonnanstine =

American baseball player (born 1983)

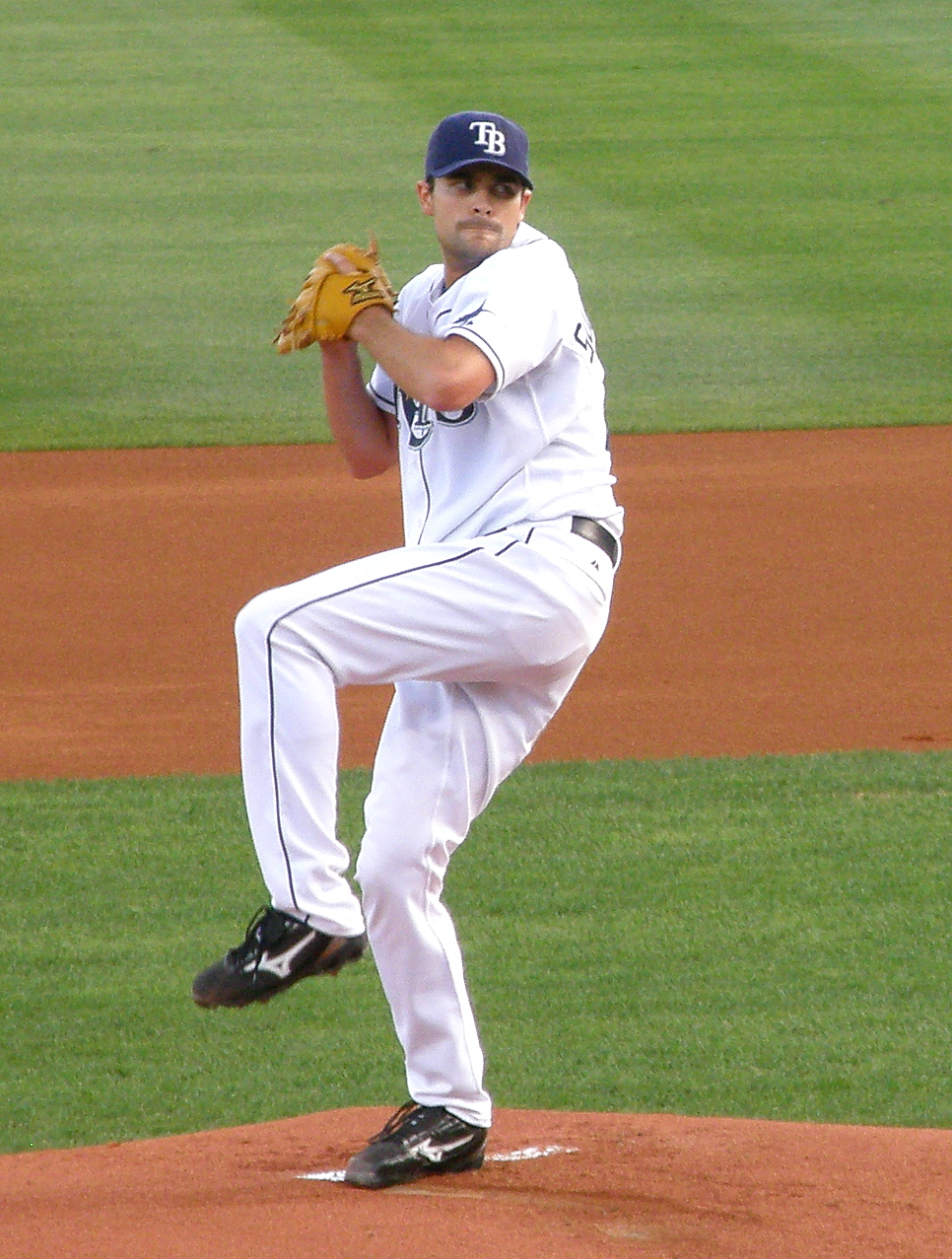
- Sonnanstine with the Tampa Bay Rays
- Pitcher
- Born: March 18, 1983 (age 42); Barberton, Ohio, U.S.
- Batted: Left Threw: Right

MLB debut
- June 5, 2007, for the Tampa Bay Devil Rays

Last MLB appearance
- September 20, 2011, for the Tampa Bay Rays

MLB statistics
- Win–loss record: 28–31
- Earned run average: 5.26
- Strikeouts: 343
- Stats at Baseball Reference

Teams
- Tampa Bay Devil Rays / Rays (2007–2011)

Andrew Michael Sonnanstine (born March 18, 1983) is an American former professional baseball starting pitcher in Major League Baseball (MLB). He played for the Tampa Bay Devil Rays / Rays. Sonnanstine is a graduate of Wadsworth High School in Wadsworth, Ohio, and attended Kent State University. He also pitched for the Sanford Mainers of the New England Collegiate Baseball League.

== Baseball career ==
=== Tampa Bay Devil Rays/Rays ===
Sonnanstine made his first major league start against the Toronto Blue Jays, receiving a no-decision. He picked up his first major league win on June 10, 2007, in a game against the Florida Marlins.

Sonnanstine demonstrated strikeout potential in 2007 when, through seven innings of work against the Marlins, he struck out ten batters, including a franchise-record seven in a row, while allowing two runs on seven hits. He also went 2-for-3 as a batter, scored his first run and drove in his first career run.

Sonnanstine has impressed many by his mental approach to the game, as he is a fierce competitor who takes a mental approach similar to that of Greg Maddux.

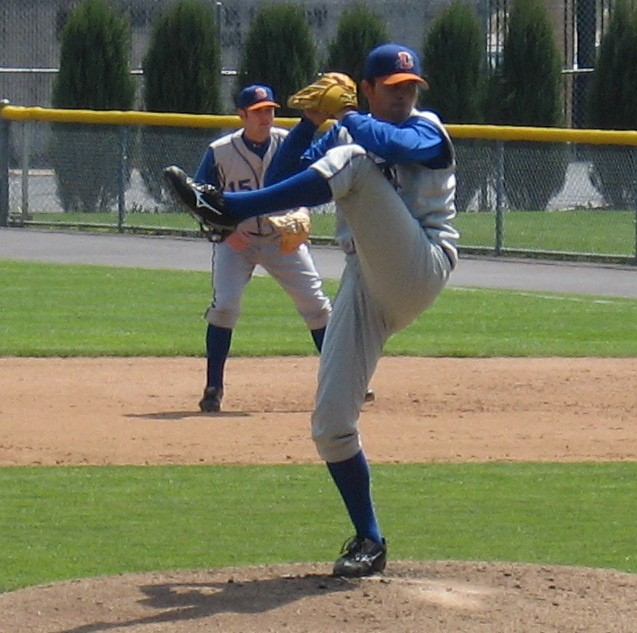
Andy Sonnanstine in the Minor Leagues

One of Sonnanstine's best starts came on August 31, 2007, against the New York Yankees at Yankee Stadium, where he pitched 8 innings, allowing 2 hits and no earned runs (1 unearned run) with 5 strikeouts and no walks. He ended his rookie campaign with a 6-10 record, pitching 130 2/3 innings with an ERA of 5.85.

In another career night, on April 19, 2008, Sonnanstine pitched a complete game shutout against the Chicago White Sox. He allowed just 3 hits and struck out 4 batters while walking only one.

On October 6, 2008, during Game 4 of the 2008 American League Division Series, Sonnanstine pitched 5 2/3 innings of 2-run baseball against the White Sox in Chicago. The Rays prevailed putting up six runs of their own and clinching the Division Series.

Sonnanstine allowed two stolen bases in two years ('07-'08).

On May 17, 2009, in a game against the Cleveland Indians, Sonnanstine was included in the starting lineup due to a mistake when Rays manager Joe Maddon entered the wrong lineup card, which had both Evan Longoria and Ben Zobrist playing third base, omitting the DH spot. The last time a pitcher was in the initial batting order in a game between two AL teams was September 23, 1976, when the White Sox batted Ken Brett eighth against the Twins. Sonnanstine went 1-for-3 with an RBI double and ended up winning the game despite the lineup error and giving up five runs.

Through July 1, 2009, Sonnanstine had the highest ERA of any major league pitcher (6.61). After the Rays traded Scott Kazmir to the Los Angeles Angels, Sonnanstine was recalled from Triple-A Durham to fill the hole in the starting rotation. In his first game since the beginning of the season against the rival Boston Red Sox, he posted a loss, giving up 3 earned runs, 2 home runs, 8 hits and 5 total runs in 4 innings with a pitch count of 91 (55s-36b).

On August 19, 2010, Sonnanstine was placed on the 15-day disabled list with a strained left hamstring. Jeremy Hellickson was called up to make his MLB debut that day against the Minnesota Twins. He was non-tendered and became a free agent on December 12, 2011

Sonnastine's 2011 book with Tucker Elliot Tampa Bay Rays IQ: The Ultimate Test of True Fandom, published by Black Mesa books contains ten chapters of Rays history and offers up 200 trivia questions.

=== Chicago Cubs ===
On December 26, 2011, Sonnanstine agreed on a one-year, non-guaranteed split contract with the Chicago Cubs. He declined to be optioned to Triple-A, and became a free agent on March 24.
