= Scott-Elliot =

Scott-Elliot is a surname, and may refer to:

- George Francis Scott Elliot (1862–1934), South African botanist cited as Scott Elliot
- James Scott-Elliot (1902–1996), British Army officer
- Walter Scott-Elliot (1895–1977), British company director and politician
- William Scott-Elliot (1849–1919), banker and theosophist

== See also ==
- Scott (surname)
- Elliot (surname)
