= USS Elliot (DD-967) =

United States Navy destroyer

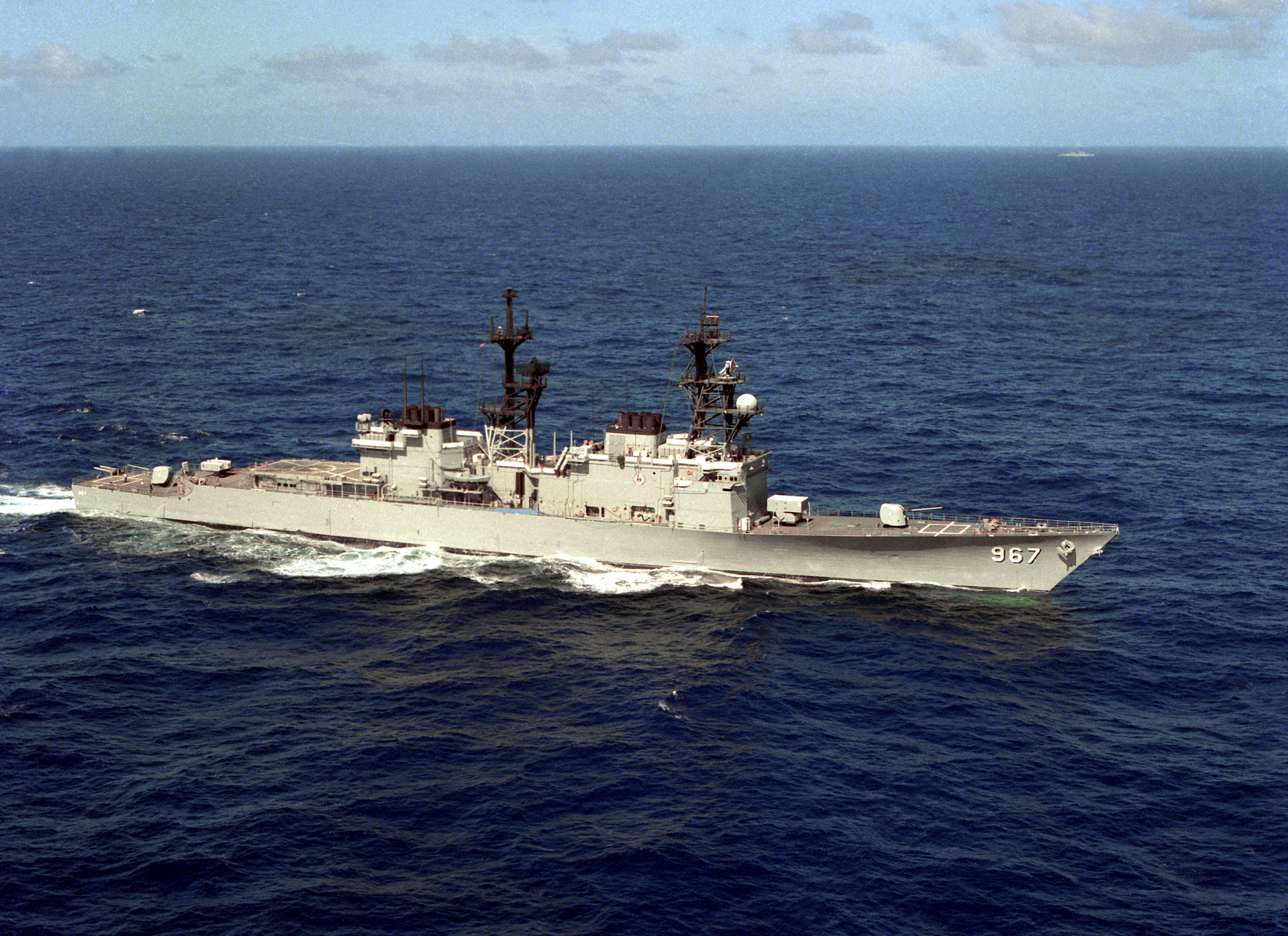
- USS Elliot on 3 December 1985

History

United States
- Namesake: Arthur J. Elliot II
- Ordered: 1 January 1971
- Builder: Ingalls Shipbuilding
- Laid down: 15 October 1973
- Launched: 19 December 1974
- Acquired: 1 December 1976
- Commissioned: 22 January 1977
- Decommissioned: 2 December 2003
- Stricken: 6 April 2004
- Identification: Callsign: NAOP; Hull number: DDG-967
- Motto: Courage, Honor, Integrity
- Fate: Sunk as target, 25 June 2005
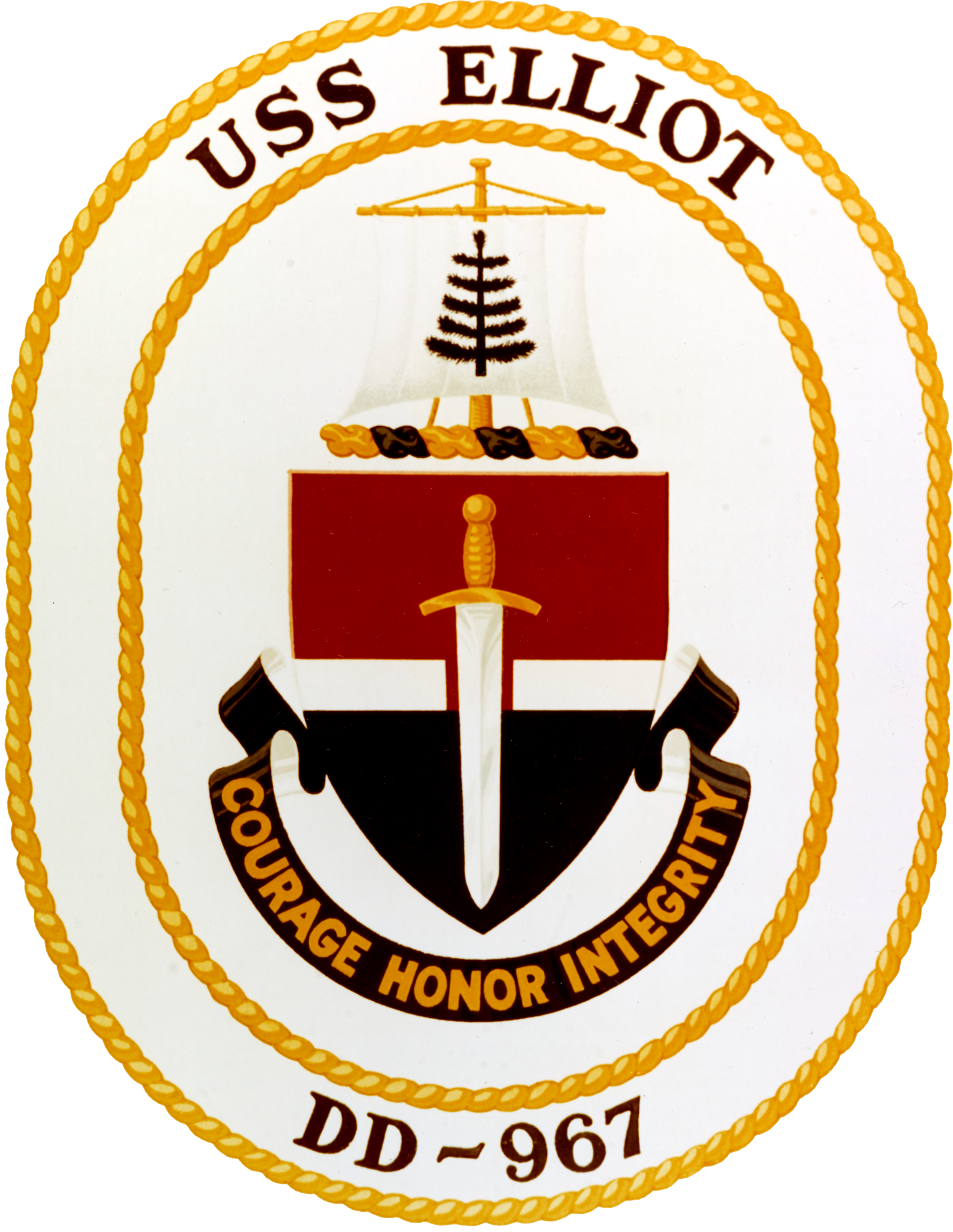
- Badge

General characteristics
- Class & type: Spruance-class destroyer
- Displacement: 8,040 long tons (8,170 t) full load
- Length: 529 ft (161 m) waterline; 563 ft (172 m) overall
- Beam: 55 ft (17 m)
- Draft: 29 ft (8.8 m)
- Installed power: 3 × 501-K17 generator sets (2,000 kW (2,700 hp) each)
- Propulsion: 4 × General Electric LM2500 gas turbines, 2 shafts, 80,000 shp (60 MW)
- Speed: 32.5 knots (60.2 km/h; 37.4 mph)
- Range: 6,000 nmi (11,000 km; 6,900 mi) at 20 knots (37 km/h; 23 mph)
- Complement: 19 officers, 315 enlisted
- Sensors & processing systems: AN/SPS-40 air search radar; AN/SPG-60 fire control radar; AN/SPS-55 surface search radar; AN/SPQ-9 gun fire control radar; Mark 23 TAS automatic detection and tracking radar; AN/SPS-65 missile fire control radar; AN/SQS-53 bow-mounted active sonar; AN/SQR-19 TACTAS towed array passive sonar; Naval Tactical Data System
- Electronic warfare & decoys: AN/SLQ-32 electronic warfare system; AN/SLQ-25 Nixie torpedo countermeasures; Mark 36 SRBOC decoy launching system; AN/SLQ-49 inflatable decoys
- Armament: 2 × 5 in (127 mm) 54 caliber Mark 45 dual purpose guns; 2 × 20 mm Phalanx CIWS Mark 15 guns; 1 × 8 cell ASROC launcher (removed); 1 × 8 cell NATO Sea Sparrow Mark 29 missile launcher; 2 × quadruple Harpoon missile canisters; 2 × Mark 32 triple 12.75 in (324 mm) torpedo tubes (Mk 46 torpedoes); 1 × 61 cell Mk 41 VLS launcher for Tomahawk missiles
- Aircraft carried: 2 × Sikorsky SH-60 Seahawk LAMPS III helicopters
- Aviation facilities: Flight deck and enclosed hangar for up to two medium-lift helicopters

USS Elliot (DD-967) was a Spruance-class destroyer in the United States Navy. Built by the Ingalls Shipbuilding Division of Litton Industries at Pascagoula, Mississippi, the ship was named for Lieutenant Commander Arthur J. Elliot II, USN (1933–1968), who as commanding officer of Patrol Boat River Squadron 57, was killed in action in the Republic of Vietnam on 29 December 1968.

== 1977 – 1981 ==
Elliot got underway on 24 January 1977 for her maiden voyage, transiting from Pascagoula, Mississippi, to San Diego, California, via the Panama Canal. She was assigned to the U.S. Pacific Fleet as a unit of Destroyer Squadron 9 (DesRon 9), under the administrative control of Commander, Cruiser Destroyer Group Five and Commander, Naval Surface Forces Pacific. After arrival, Elliot conducted five weeks of shakedown training and participated in a combat exercise. Following these evolutions, she returned to her builders for a post shakedown yard availability.

After leaving the yard, Elliot sailed to Rockland, Maine arriving on 25 August. Neighboring Thomaston was the hometown of the sailor for whom the ship was named. During a four-day stay, the ship hosted several thousand guests and embarked 650 guests for a six-hour guest cruise. On 24 September Elliot reported to Long Beach Naval Shipyard for a six-month restricted yard availability during which her NATO Sea Sparrow and Harpoon missile systems were installed.

On 1 August 1978 Elliot shifted from the operational command of Destroyer Squadron Nine to Destroyer Squadron 31 (DesRon 31). Elliot departed for her first deployment, a seven-month Western Pacific tour, on 21 February 1979 as flagship of DesRon 31 in company with the aircraft carrier Ranger. On 31 March, Elliot departed Subic Bay, Philippines with Ranger, for operations in the Indian Ocean. Less than a week later, Elliot was transiting the Strait of Malacca in lead of Ranger when the carrier was involved in a collision with the oil tanker M/V Fortune resulting in the carrier having to return to Subic Bay for repairs. Elliot arrived in Diego Garcia on 12 April. Elliot then joined a battle group centered around Midway and participated in operations in the Gulf of Aden to maintain a U.S. military presence in the area. Elliot returned to Subic Bay on 15 June. Elliot was awarded the Navy Expeditionary Medal for Indian Ocean contingency operations. Elliot arrived back at her homeport from her first deployment on 9 September 1979. Also notable on this deployment was Elliot tailing Soviet carrier Minsk for five days of observation of operations.

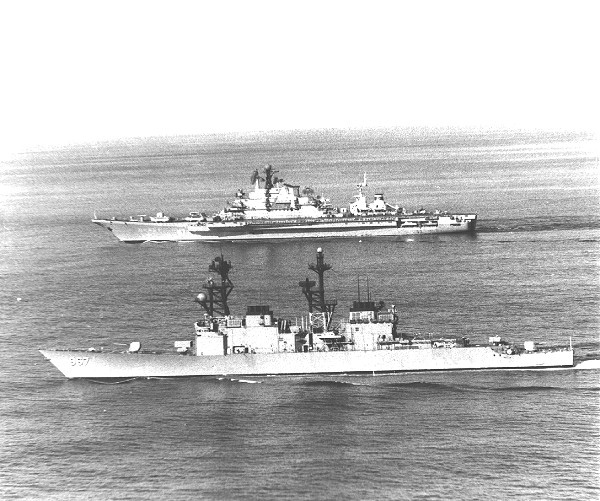
Elliot (foreground) conducting surveillance operations against the Soviet carrier Minsk

Elliot began her second deployment in 1980, under the command of Captain Stephen Clarey then after a change of command in Subic Bay, Philippines, Commander Doug Norton. On 23 January 1981, Elliot suffered a main bearing casualty resulting in one of her gas turbine engines having to be replaced. This replacement was completed at Subic Bay in only two days. On 21 April Elliot encountered the first of several refugee boats. Over the next eight days Elliot picked up 158 refugees for which the crew was awarded the Humanitarian Service Medal. Port visits on this deployment included stops in Hawaii, Guam, Korea, Thailand, Hong Kong, Philippines, Japan, and Singapore. She returned from this deployment on 23 May.

== 1981 – 1985 ==
On 1 June 1981 Elliot was transferred to Destroyer Squadron 21. Elliot reported to Todd Pacific Shipyard in Seattle, Washington on 17 August for the first private sector overhaul ever conducted of a Spruance-class destroyer. Among other refurbishments and installations during this overhaul Elliot received an SLQ-32(V)2 electronic warfare system. Elliot completed overhaul on 30 April 1982. She returned to her homeport of NS San Diego on 21 May. On 1 July Elliot was reassigned from DesRon 21 to DesRon 17.

Elliot departed San Diego, California on 13 April 1983 for the third deployment of her career. Port visits on this deployment included stops in Hawaii, Philippines, Korea, Japan, Thailand, Guam and Hong Kong. On 31 July, a small boat was spotted by the forward lookout. A total of 68 Vietnamese refugees were subsequently rescued and were turned over to state officials in Subic Bay. Elliot was again awarded the Humanitarian Service Medal for her rescue operation. During August, Elliot endured being at sea through the combined forces of two typhoons, though no significant damage resulted. On 1 September, Elliot departed Sasebo, Japan on four hours' notice, to respond to the downing of KAL 007. Elliot steamed at 32 knots (59 km/h) for one thousand miles (1,600 km) and arrived approximately 48 hours later, the first Allied ship on station. "Elliot" remained on scene until 14 September along with other units of Allied nations (U.S., Korea, Japan). During the tense days immediately after the downing, "Elliot" encountered some thirty-two Soviet ships in the SAS area, most of which were men-of-war. "Elliot" and all Soviet combatant ships were at a continuous state of General Quarters (Battle Stations), with deck weapons ready to fire. Elliot returned from her third deployment on 18 November 1983.

On 27 January 1984, Elliot conducted a safe weapons offload at the Seal Beach Naval Weapons Station. Shortly after departing this facility, Elliot struck a subsurface obstruction in the Seal Beach channel, causing some limited damage to the underwater hull and the starboard propeller. On 2 February, Elliot commenced a planned three-month selected repair availability (SRA) period in San Diego. On 30 April, Elliot proceeded to the Todd Shipyard facilities in San Pedro, California for repairs to her starboard propeller and sonar dome. In May, Elliot shifted operational command to Destroyer Squadron 5. In October, Elliot participated in Fleet Week '84 festivities with 18 other ships in San Francisco, California. Elliot hosted more than 10,000 visitors during this event.

== 1985 – 2003 ==
On 10 July 1985, Elliot departed on her fourth deployment as part of the New Jersey battle group. Port visits on this deployment included stops in Hawaii, Japan, Korea, Philippines, Brunei, and Hong Kong. In mid-September Elliot was engaged in an exercise with Republic of Korea ships. During the exercise, Elliot rendered on-scene assistance to the Darter which was disabled during a collision with the merchant ship Kansas Getty. On 1 December Elliot departed Subic Bay in company with the Kitty Hawk battle group for transit to Pearl Harbor, Hawaii arriving on 12 December. Elliot returned to her San Diego homeport on 21 December, ending her fourth deployment.

In May 1986 Elliot began a two-month selected repair availability which included installation of flight deck modifications necessary to support LAMPS Mk III helicopter operations. On 11 October Elliot arrived at San Francisco to participate in Fleet Week '87 festivities.

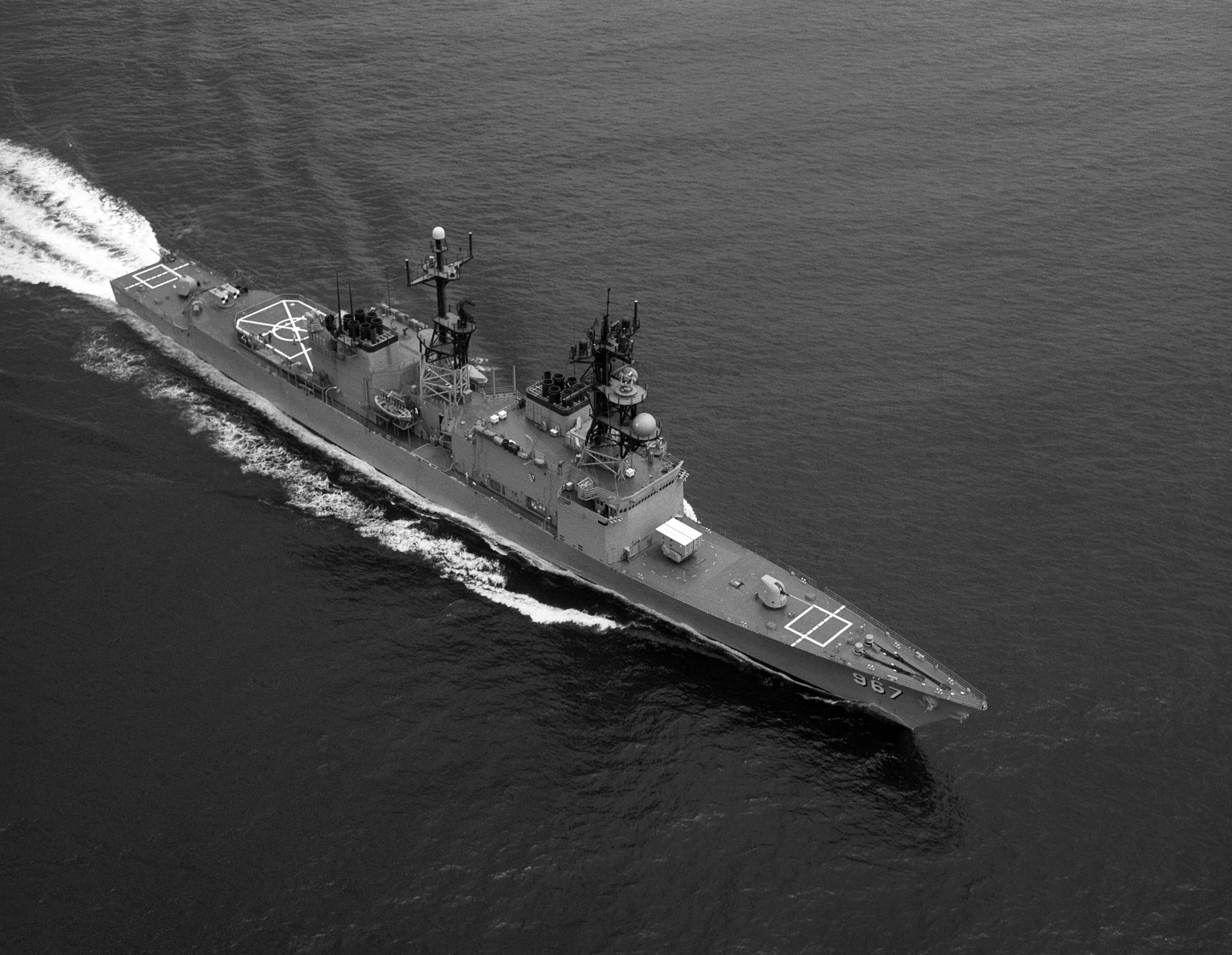
Elliot in November 1987 prior to removal of ASROC and addition of CIWS.

In January 1987, Elliot departed on her fifth deployment. Highlights off this deployment included operations in the Bering Strait.

Elliot received a major overhaul in the 1988 / 1989 time frame, receiving, among other things, VLS, Phalanx CIWS, new TACAN and an upgraded Sea Sparrow system including MK 23 TAS radar.

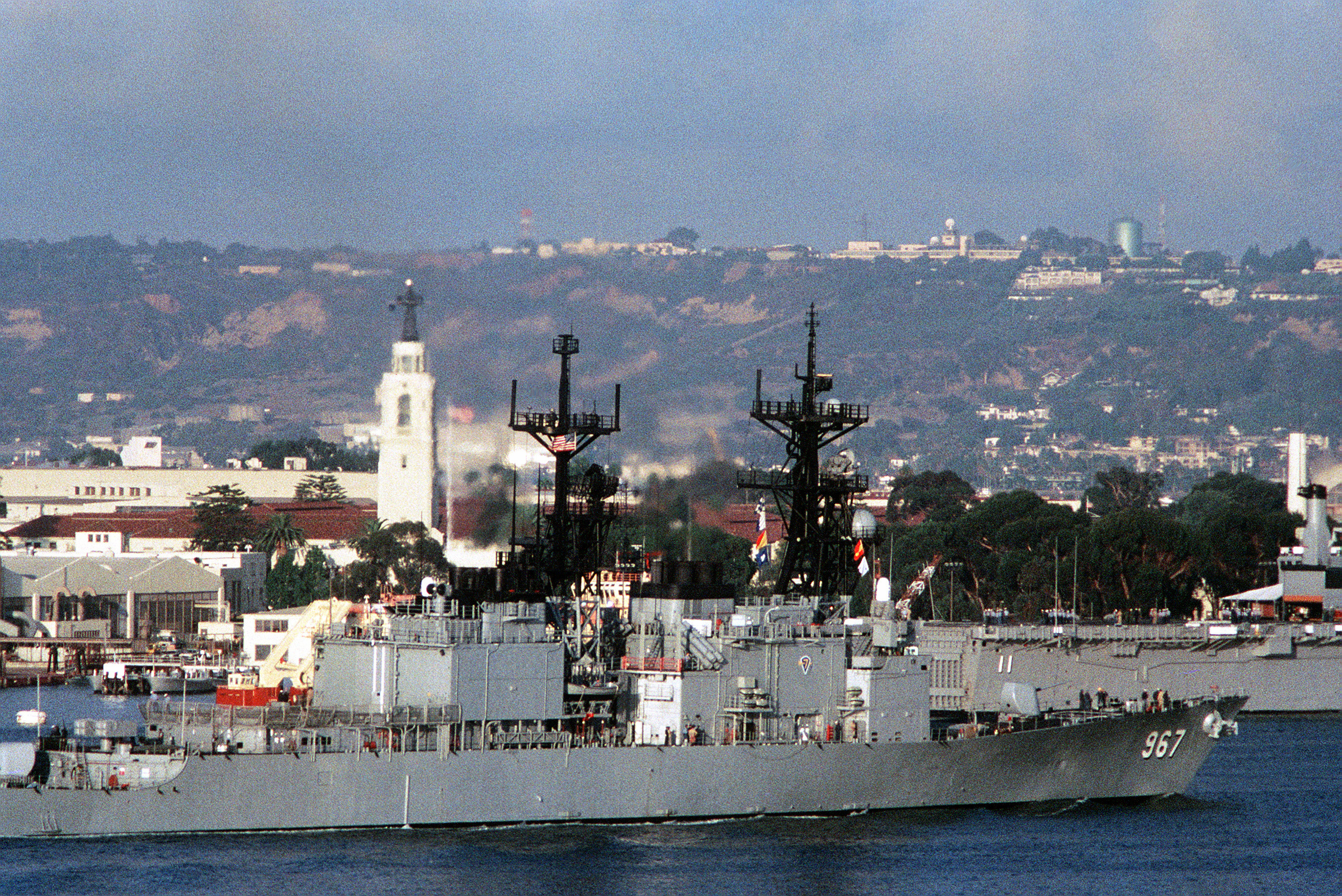
Elliot during PACEX '89 showing CIWS, Sea Sparrow modifications. Additional MK 23 TAS and new TACAN on aft mast.

Elliot departed San Diego on 9 September 1989 to participate in PACEX-89, said to be the largest major naval exercise in the Pacific since the close of World War II.Elliot's course took it north to the Gulf of Alaska, then on to the Bering Sea, the northwest Pacific, East China Sea, and the Sea of Japan. Elliot made its sole port stop at Sasebo, Japan before returning home on 9 November 1989. During PACEX-89, Elliot conducted joint operations with other units of the Pacific Fleet as well as elements of the Japanese Maritime Self Defense Force. Elliot and its battlegroup were also overflown by two Soviet TU-95 Bear D reconnaissance aircraft. Another highlight was the group photograph Elliot participated in as one of fifty ships gathered in formation.

Elliot departed San Diego for WestPac-90 on 1 February 1990 as part of the USS Carl Vinson (CVN-70) Carrier Battlegroup "Charlie." Ports visited included Pearl Harbor, Hawaii; Pusan, Korea; Subic Bay, Philippines; Singapore; Pattaya Beach, Thailand; Diego Garcia, BIOT; Muscat, Oman; Fremantle; and Hong Kong. Elliot also participated in Team Spirit 1990 exercises with the South Korean military.

While transiting the South China Sea on 20 April 1990, Elliot rescued 35 Vietnamese refugees left adrift in a derelict boat and claiming to be the victims of pirates. Elliot's captain, CDR Timothy LaFleur, made the determination to embark the refugees and scuttle their boat. After the refugees were fed and clothed (many in clothes donated by crewmembers), Elliot turned them over to a representative of the United Nations High Commission for Refugees in Singapore on 21 April.

Elliot returned from deployment on 1 August 1990, one day before Iraq invaded Kuwait. Elliot then entered the NASSCO yards on 9 September 1990 and remained there until 17 December, thus spending the majority of the Persian Gulf War on the sidelines.

Elliot deployed for WestPac-91 on 31 July 1991 with COMDESRON 17 embarked. Port visits were made to Pearl Harbor; Subic Bay; Phuket, Thailand; Bahrain; Oman; Abu Dhabi, UAE; and Hong Kong. On 21 October, while deployed off the coast of Kuwait, Elliot was alerted by the French DGSE ship Le Berry to the presence of a drifting Iraqi LUGM-145 mine approximately 12 nm offshore from Kuwait's Mina Al-Ahmadi port. Explosive Ordnance Disposal Mobile Unit One, Detachment 31 team members were flown in from Bahrain. With the assistance of Elliot's air detachment the mine was safely detonated, resulting in a plume of water hundreds of feet tall. Elliot spent the Christmas holiday in Hong Kong before returning to San Diego on 20 January 1992.

Elliot reported to Southwest Marine Shipyard, San Diego in May 1992 for a yard period where she remained until August. On 16 November Elliot departed San Diego for a five-week counter narcotics cruise. This cruise included a port stop in Puerto Vallarta, Mexico. Elliot returned from this cruise on 21 December.

In June 1993, Elliot arrived in Portland, Oregon for the Portland Rose Festival. On 9 July Elliot departed San Diego for her next deployment. Port visits on this deployment included Hawaii, Guam, Singapore, United Arab Emirates, Bahrain, Diego Garcia, Australia, and Fiji. By late August, Elliot was operating off the coast of Iran. Elliot continued operating in this region into November, serving as anti-air warfare commander and Persian Gulf force over-the-horizon track coordinator for portions of this time period. She also frequently conducted contingency strike operations exercises. During these operations, Elliot participated in boardings of merchant vessels in support of United Nations Security Council resolutions.

In August 20 1998, Operation Infinite Reach (Resolute Response) begins with two simultaneous retaliatory raids in response to the twin al-Qaeda attacks on the embassies in East Africa on Aug. 7. Elliot (DD-967), along with USS Cowpens (CG 63), USS Shiloh (CG 67), USS Milius (DDG 69), USS Columbia (SSN 771) fired 73 Tomahawks at the Zhawar Kili al-Badr terrorist training and support complex, 30 miles southwest of Khowst, Afghanistan.

Elliot operated out of San Diego, California until she was decommissioned on 2 December 2003.

The decommissioned Elliot and William H. Standley were sunk off the eastern coast of Australia as part of Exercise Talisman Sabre, Elliot on 22 June 2005 and William H. Standley on 23 June 2005. Elliot is now resting at a depth of 4,551 fathoms (27,306 feet (8,323 meters) in the Coral Sea, located at 24°43′S 155°50′E, or roughly 100 nautical miles (190 kilometres) east of Fraser Island, Queensland, Australia.

== Awards ==
- Navy Unit Commendation – (Aug 1998)
- Navy Meritorious Unit Commendation – (Sep 1983, Sep 1989 – Jul 1990, Dec 1992 – May 1993, Jan 1999 – Sep 2001)
- Battle "E" – (1979, 1981, 1992, 1993)
- Navy Expeditionary Medal – (Apr–Jun 1979)
- Southwest Asia Service Medal – (Sep–Dec 1991)
- Humanitarian Service Medal – (21–27 Apr 1981, 31 Jul 1983)

== Gallery ==
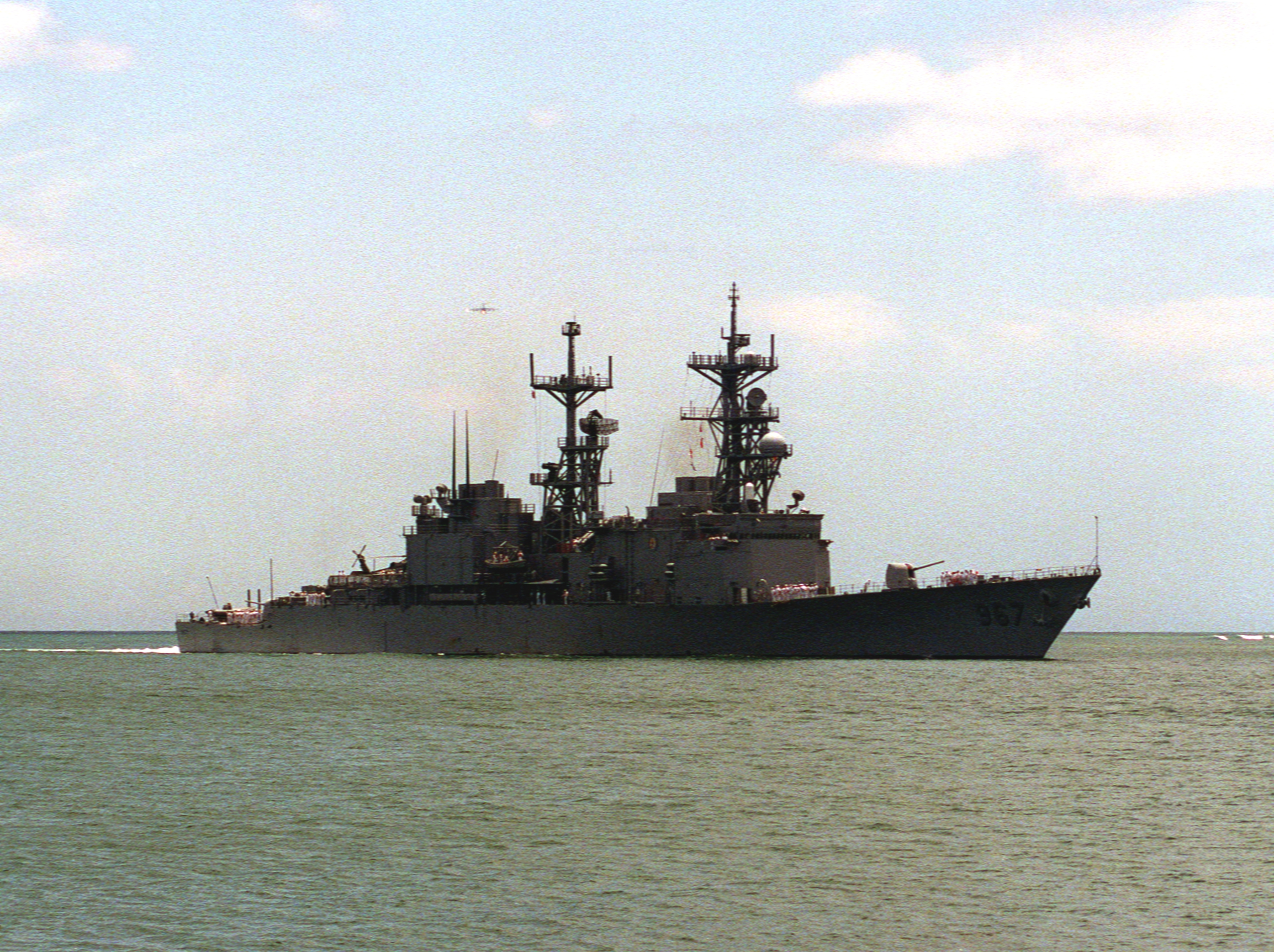
USS Elliot entering Pearl Harbor on 1 June 1991

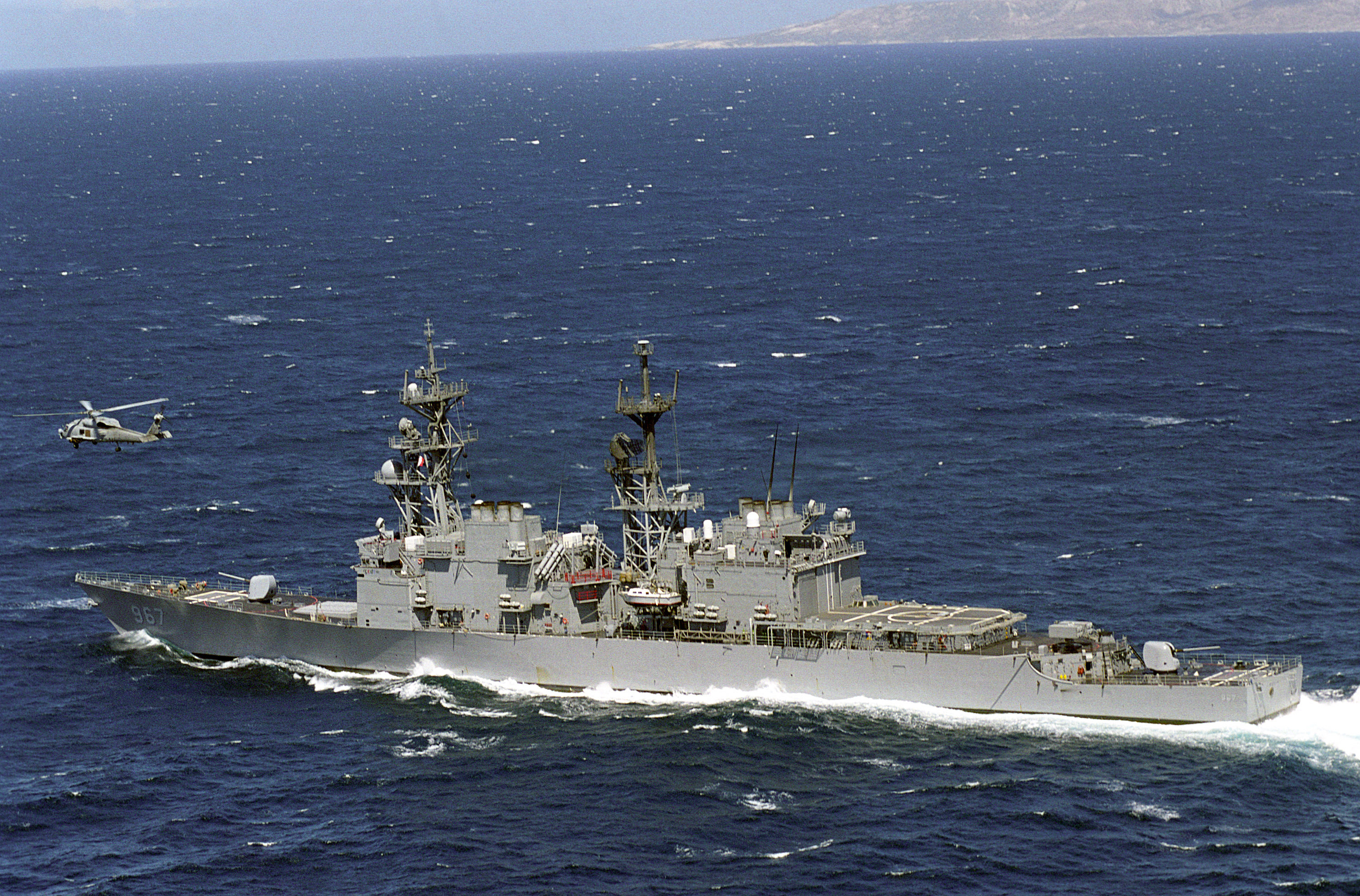
USS Elliot with a SH-60 on 7 April 1998

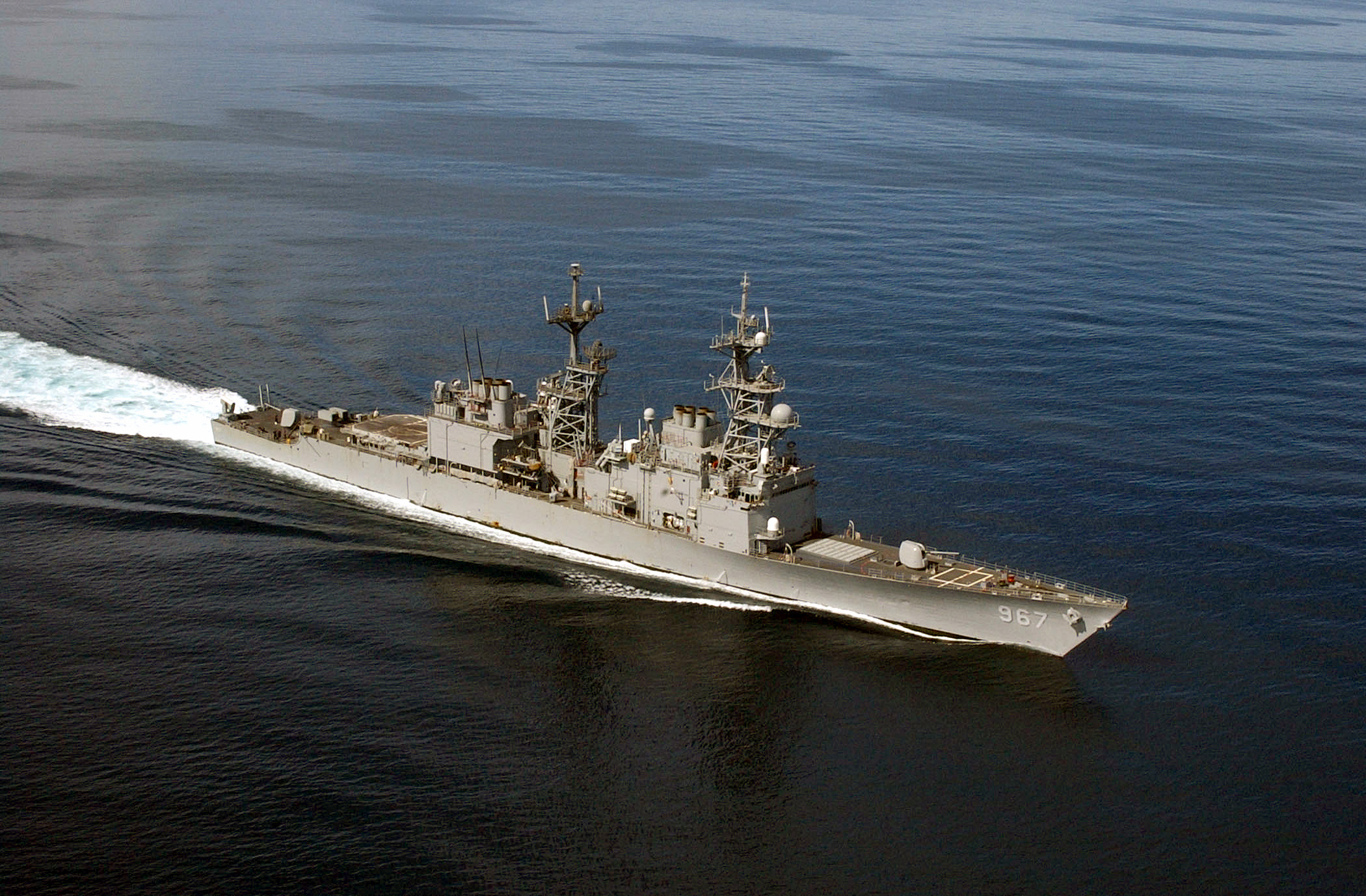
USS Elliot in the Arabian Sea on 2 January 2002

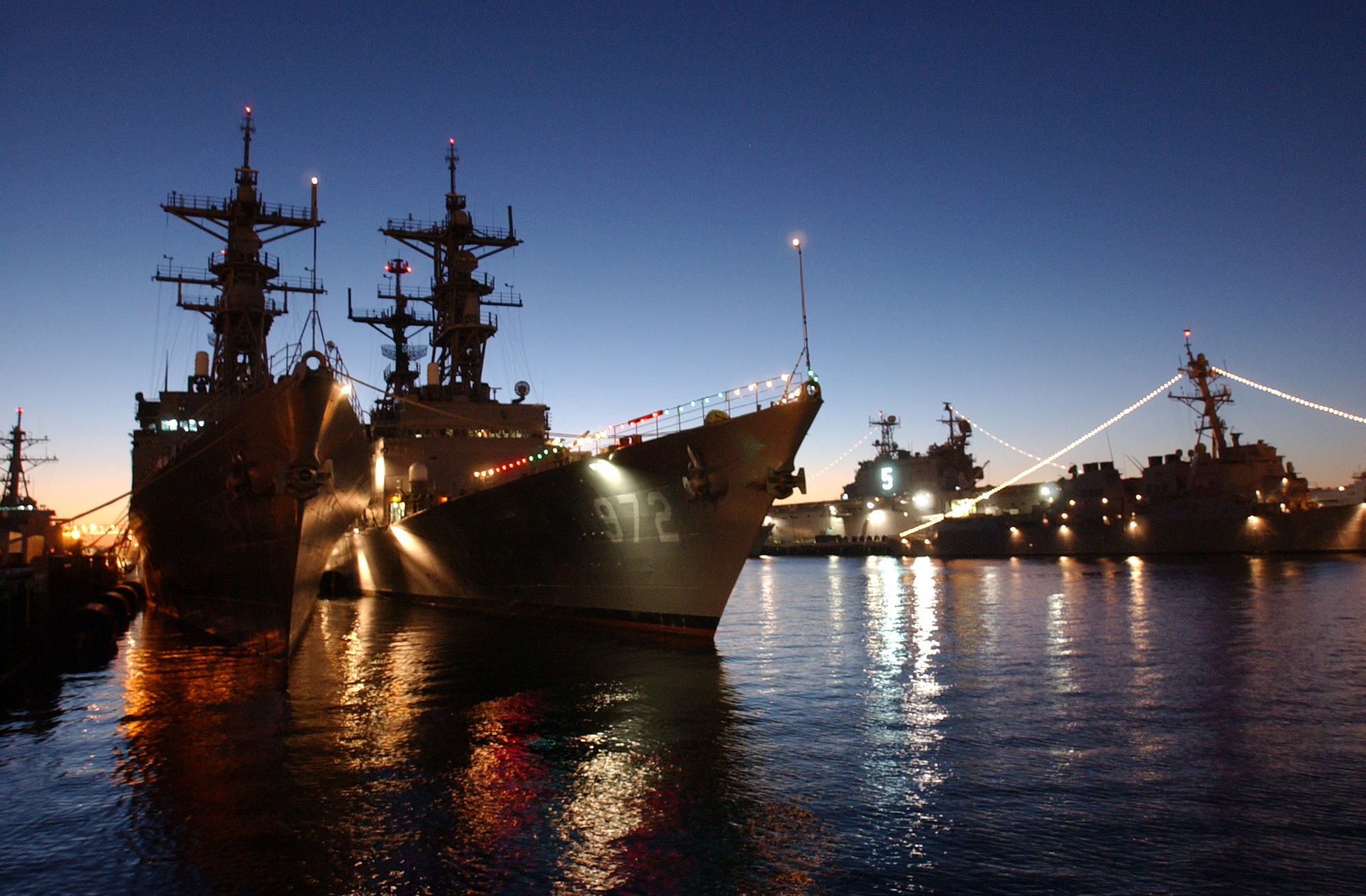
USS Elliot and USS Oldendorf on 1 January 2003
