= Eliott (surname) =

Eliott is a surname, and may refer to:

- Allan Eliott-Lockhart (1803–1878), British politician
- Daniel Eliott (1798–1872), Scottish civil servant in British India and governor of Madras
- Francis Augustus Eliott, 2nd Baron Heathfield (1750–1813), British Army general
- George Augustus Eliott, 1st Baron Heathfield (1717–1790), British defender of Gibraltar
- Gilbert Eliott (Australian politician) (1796–1871), politician in colonial Queensland
- Sir Gilbert Eliott, 3rd Baronet, of Stobs (c. 1680–1764), Scottish politician
- Harry Eliott (1882–1959), French painter and illustrator
- John Gordon Eliott (1872–1948), New Zealand Member of Parliament
- Susannah Eliott, Australian science communicator and evidence advocate
- Thomas Fuller-Eliott-Drake (1785–1870), British Army officer and baronet
- Tim Eliott (1935–2011), New Zealand actor

== See also ==
- Eliot (surname)
- Elliot (surname)
