= USS Knox =

USS Knox may refer to the following ships of the United States Navy:

- USS Knox (APA-46), was a Bayfield-class attack transport launched 17 July 1943 and sold in 1947
- USS Knox (FF-1052), was a Knox-class frigate launched 19 November 1966 and sunk as a target in 2007
- USS Frank Knox (DD-742), was a Gearing-class destroyer launched 17 September 1944 and transferred to Greece in 1971
