= Arthur J. Elliot II =

American naval commander (1933–1968)

- Born: Arthur James Elliot II; April 9, 1933; Thomaston, Maine, U.S.
- Died: December 29, 1968 (aged 35); Gò Công, Vietnam
- Burial place: Cremated, buried at Sea
- Military career
- Allegiance: United States of America
- Branch: United States Navy
- Service years: 1956–1968
- Rank: Lieutenant commander
- Nickname: "Jack"
- Unit: PBR Squadron 57
- Commands: River Patrol Flotilla 5 (RIVPATFLOT 5)
- Conflicts: Vietnam War †; Operation Game Warden; Operation Sealords
- Awards: Legion of Merit Medal; Bronze Star Medal(Combat Distinguishing Device); Purple Heart; Combat Action Ribbon

Lieutenant Commander Arthur James Elliot II (April 9, 1933 – December 29, 1968) was an American naval officer killed during the Vietnam War. He received a Bachelor of Science degree from the Gorham State Teachers College in Gorham, Maine, in 1955. In June 1956, he entered the Navy Officer Candidate School and was commissioned an ensign in the Naval Reserve in October of that year. He then served successive sea duty tours on USS Lyman K. Swenson (DD-729) for two years, and was promoted to lieutenant (junior grade). His next tour was on USS Little Rock (CLG-4). In 1962, Elliot was assigned as aide and flag lieutenant to commander, naval surface forces, U.S. Pacific Fleet. Upon completion of this tour, he reported for duty as operations officer aboard USS John King (DDG-3). He was the son of Mr. and Mrs. Albert B. Elliot of Thomaston, Maine.

In December 1967, Elliot volunteered for duty in Vietnam, where he served as commanding officer of PBR Squadron 57, operating in the Mekong Delta. Under his command, his squadron of river boats achieved an outstanding combat record, taking part in several major riverine operations. On December 29, 1968, Elliot was killed in action while leading his squadron in a riverine interdiction mission. He received the Bronze Star with Combat "V".

Elliot's awards include the Legion of Merit Medal, the Bronze Star with Combat "V", the Purple Heart, National Defense Service Medal, the Vietnam Service medal with two bronze stars, the Vietnam Gallantry Cross with palm, the National Order of Vietnam (5th Class), the Vietnam Campaign Ribbon, the Armed Forces Expeditionary Service Medal and the Navy Expedition Medal.

== Honors ==
USS Elliot (DD-967) was named in his honor and in commission from January 22, 1977, to December 2, 2003.
