= Mattha Elliot =

- Full name: Matthew Elliot
- Born: 14 June 1870 Hawick, Scotland
- Died: 3 December 1945 (aged 75) Hawick, Scotland

Rugby union career
- Position: Halfback
International career
Years	Team	Apps	(Points)
1895–98	Scotland	6	(0)

Matthew Elliot (14 June 1870 – 3 December 1945) was a Scottish international rugby union player.

Born in Hawick, Elliot was a halfback and played his rugby for hometown club Hawick RFC, where he formed a partnership in the halves with Davie Patterson that was known as "Mattha and Davie".

Elliot was Hawick's first Scotland international, debuting in a win over Wales at Edinburgh during the 1895 Home Nations. He next played for Scotland in their 1896 Calcutta Cup win over England at Cathkin Park and finished his career with a total of six caps, making his last appearance in 1898.

== See also ==
- List of Scotland national rugby union players
