= Elliot-Murray-Kynynmound =

Elliot-Murray-Kynynmound (/kɪˈnɪnmənd/) may refer to:

- Gilbert Elliot-Murray-Kynynmound, 1st Earl of Minto PC (1751–1814), Scottish politician diplomat
- Gilbert Elliot-Murray-Kynynmound, 2nd Earl of Minto GCB, PC (1782–1859), British diplomat and Whig politician
- William Elliot-Murray-Kynynmound, 3rd Earl of Minto (1814–1891), eldest son of the second earl
- Gilbert Elliot-Murray-Kynynmound, 4th Earl of Minto KG, GCSI, GCMG, GCIE, PC (1845–1914), British politician, Viceroy of India
- Victor Elliot-Murray-Kynynmound, 5th Earl of Minto, member of the British nobility
- Gilbert Elliot-Murray-Kynynmound, 6th Earl of Minto (1928–2005), member of British nobility from Scotland
- Timothy Elliot-Murray-Kynynmound, 7th Earl of Minto (born 1953), the head of British company "Paperchase"
