= Tucker Elliot =

American sportswriter

Tucker Elliot is an American sportswriter and the author of sports history and trivia books. In 2011, he collaborated with Major League pitcher Andy Sonnanstine to write a book on the Tampa Bay Rays. In 2012, he collaborated with Dale Murphy (who wrote the foreword) to support the I Won't Cheat Foundation with a new book on the Atlanta Braves. In addition to writing sports books, Elliot was a writer for the screenplay "Shedding Baggage" and he's also the author of the forthcoming book "Extraordinary," which is the true story of professional baseball player Tony Stevens who joined the Marines after 9/11 and served three combat tours in Iraq. In March 2013, Elliot's book "The Day Before 9/11" was published. According to Amazon, "The Day Before 9/11" is "a harrowing true story that spans America's first decade in the war on terror ... [and] portrays in riveting detail the sacrifices made by military families serving overseas and the enduring pain that accompanies the tragic loss of life."
