= Robert Henry Elliot =

Robert Henry Elliot (1837–1914) was an early British coffee planter in Mysore, India. He was the author of books about plantation life in Mysore and about farming in Scotland. He came from Kelso, Roxburghshire, Scotland.

== Plantations ==
According to Elliot's own account in Gold, Sport, and Coffee Planting In Mysore, he arrived in Bombay in 1855 at 18 years of age. From there he sailed to Mangalore, then headed inland through the ghauts to the high plateau of Mysore, where he joined Frederick Green, who had begun his plantation in 1843. The first European coffee plantation to its south had just started in 1854, while the second, some 70 miles (110 km) to the north, was being established by three Scottish planters. In 1856 Elliot started his own plantation at Bartchinhulla, Sakleshpur, Mysore State.

== Mixed planting ==
At his farm called Clifton Park in Kelso, Scotland, he formulated what he termed the "Clifton Park System". Several editions of his book on the subject, Agricultural Changes appeared between 1898 and 1943. (The last two editions of 1908 and 1943 being entitled The Clifton Park System of Farming and laying down land to grass.) In this book, which was written prior to the widespread availability and adoption of man-made fertilizer, he advocated building up the organic content of soil by planting a mixture of grasses and other plants, particularly deep-rooted plants such as chicory. Modern organic growers still find Elliot's work applicable today.

== Selected works ==
- The Experience of a Planter in the Jungles of Mysore, London: Chapman and Hall, 1871
- Concerning John’s Indian affairs, London: Chapman and Hall, 1872
- Written on their Foreheads, 2 vols, London: Sampson Low, 1879
- On laying down permanent pastures, and the grasses suitable for alternate husbandry
- Union Agricultural Society Lectures, no. 2. Kelso, 1883
- Gold, Sport, And Coffee Planting In Mysore, 1898 (Project Gutenberg etext)
- The Clifton Park System of Farming and laying down land to grass, 1898–1953 (two under the alternative title Agricultural Changes)

== See also ==
- The Clifton Park System of Farming
- Thirty Years Farming on the Clifton Park System – an account by English farmer William Lamin of his experiences with Elliot's recommendations
