= Peter Elliot =

American writer and media personality

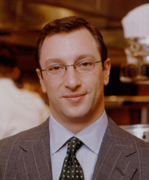
- Born: December 9, 1966 (age 59); New York City
- Occupations: writer, editor, media personality
- Website: www.peterelliot.org

Peter Elliot (born December 9, 1966) is an American writer, editor, and media personality best known for his biography of restaurateur Sirio Maccioni, Sirio: The Story of My Life and Le Cirque and for the development of DINE, the restaurant search engine and lifestyle portal for the global financial news and media company Bloomberg LP. He is manager of Lifestyle Products at Bloomberg LP.

== Background ==
Elliot was born in New York City and grew up in New York City, London, and Scotland. He attended the University of St Andrews in Scotland.

== Career ==
Elliot started his career with McGraw-Hill in London tracking oil tankers and eventually OPEC and the newly reemerging East European and Russian oil industry. He was the youngest ever cover story writer for Businessweek. In 1991 an introduction to Michael Bloomberg led to Elliot working on their commodities team. When Bloomberg bought WNEW in 1992, Bloomberg asked Elliot to anchor the commodities segment and also to widen out into lifestyle-related news, data, and services. Following this expansion Elliot worked on DINE, which was designed for the Bloomberg Terminal to give Bloomberg clients and employees a platform to discuss, rate, and review restaurants in a private forum with their peers.

Elliot wrote the biography of restaurateur Sirio Maccioni, Sirio: The Story of My Life and Le Cirque and his writing has been featured in Vanity Fair and Town & Country.

From 1993 to 2001 Elliot's food program was broadcast on Bloomberg Radio. Interview guests included leading food industry personalities, notably Mario Batali, Ruthi Reichl, Anthony Bourdain, Jamie Oliver, Julia Child, and George Lang.

=== Television ===
2005 – Iron Chef America: Season 1, Episode 13 "Mario Batali vs. Anita Lo" – Guest Judge.
