= John Elliot (antiquary) =

English lawyer and antiquary

John Elliot (1725–1782) was an English lawyer and antiquary.

== Life ==
Elliot was born in 1725 in the parish of St. John-sub-Castro, Lewes, the son of Obadiah Elliot, proprietor of a brewery. After learning his rudiments at Lewes Grammar School he was articled to an attorney, and eventually secured a good practice. Despite business, and a Methodist wife, he kept up an antiquarian correspondence. He was in touch with William Burrell and John Watson. To Watson he passed information for his Memoirs of the Ancient Earls of Warren and Surrey.

Elliot was elected a fellow of the Society of Antiquaries 7 December 1780. He died suddenly in Southampton Row, Bloomsbury, 28 February 1782, aged 57. He had asked "to be buried in the vault in St. Michael's churchyard in Lewes with my father and mother". By his wife, Margaret Cook of Berwick-upon-Tweed, who survived him, he left no issue.

== Legacy ==
Elliott bequeathed his manuscript collections on Lewes and Sussex to Burrell. They later went, with Burrell's manuscripts, to the British Museum. He had an antiquarian library at his chambers in the Inner Temple, which he directed to be sold after his death. He never published.
