= Edward Elliot-Square =

English cricketer

Personal information
- Born: 7 May 1978 (age 48); Winchester, Hampshire, England
- Batting: Right-handed
- Bowling: Right-arm medium

Domestic team information
- Years: Team
- 1997–1999: Dorset

Career statistics
Competition	List A
Matches	1
Runs scored	20
Batting average	–
100s/50s	0/0
Top score	20*
Balls bowled	60
Wickets	0
Bowling average	–
5 wickets in innings	–
10 wickets in match	–
Best bowling	–
Catches/stumpings	0/–
- Source: Cricinfo, 15 March 2010

Edward Elliot-Square (born 7 May 1978) is a former English cricketer. Elliot-Square was a right-handed batsman who bowled right-arm medium pace.

Elliot-Square made his debut for Dorset in the 1997 Minor Counties Championship against Cornwall. From 1997 to 1999 he represented Dorset in 6 Minor Counties matches, with his final match for the county coming against Oxfordshire in the 1999 season.

In 1999 Elliot-Square played his only List A match for Dorset against Scotland in the 1999 NatWest Trophy, scoring 20 runs and bowling 10 expensive overs.
