= James Elliot-Square =

English cricketer

James Elliot-Square (born 22 May 1983) 6ft 2in and 95kg is an English former cricketer. He was a right-handed batsman and a right-arm medium-fast bowler who played for Dorset. He was born in Salisbury, Wiltshire.

Elliot-Square, who made his debut Minor Counties Championship appearance for Dorset during the 2001 season, played in his only List A match in September 2001, against Scotland. Batting in the lower order, Elliot-Square scored a single run, and took bowling figures of 0-21 from three overs.

Most recently, Elliot-Square played for Surrey side Esher in the Cockspur Cup.

Elliot-Square played rugby alongside his cricket career. He was often referred to as an "Old Garry Ringrose", due to his hard hitting outside centre ball carrying style of play.
