= Peaston =

Coordinates: 55.877°N 2.916°W

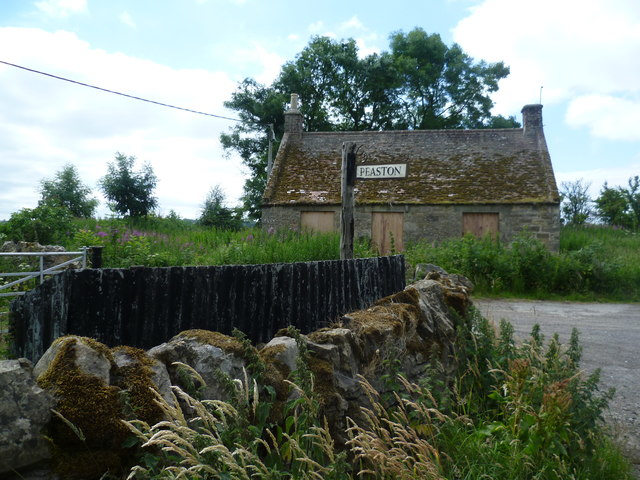
- The small village at Peaston Farm on the B6371

- Location within Scotland
- Population: 10
- OS grid reference: NT426652
- Civil parish: Ormiston
- Council area: East Lothian Council
- Lieutenancy area: East Lothian
- Country: Scotland
- Sovereign state: United Kingdom
- Post town: TRANENT
- Postcode district: EH35
- Dialling code: 01875
- Police: Scotland
- Fire: Scottish
- Ambulance: Scottish
- UK Parliament: East Lothian
- Scottish Parliament: East Lothian

Peaston is a small settlement on the B6371 road in the parish of Ormiston in East Lothian, Scotland, about 14 miles (23 km) south-east of Edinburgh, 7 miles (11 km) south-west of Haddington, 4 miles (6.4 km) east of Ormiston and 2 miles (3.2 km) east of Pencaitland.

The Barony of Peaston was transferred from Pencaitland to Ormiston in 1648.

Peaston Smiddy, built in the 18th century, is on the Buildings at Risk Register for Scotland.
