= Adam Elliot (traveller) =

English clergyman and traveller

Adam Elliot (died 1700) was an English clergyman and traveller.

== Life ==
Elliot was born in Jedburgh in Scotland, the son of Henry Elliot, a clerk. He was member of Caius College, Cambridge, from 1664 to 1668, when he took his B.A. degree.

According to his own account, Elliot then travelled about Europe for the next two years, and was returning to England in June 1670, when he was taken captive by Moors and sold as a slave. His description of his captivity and escape cannot be assumed true in detail. In November Elliot reached England, and worked as a private tutor for the next two years. In December 1672 he was ordained priest by the Bishop of London. He was then chaplain to Lord Grey of Werke (d. 1675), after which he officiated in Dublin, until in 1679 he was summoned to England as witness in a lawsuit arising out of Lord Grey's will.

Elliot was about to return to Ireland when he was apprehended on the evidence of Titus Oates, who accused him of being a Jesuit priest, and an apostate to Islam. Elliot gained his discharge without being brought to trial, but was reapprehended in Dublin for abusing Oates, and fined £200. In 1682 he brought an action against Oates for defamation of character, and gained £20 damages.

== Works ==
Elliot's Apologia pro Vitâ Suâ was published in 1682: it is sarcastically entitled A Modest Vindication of Titus Oates the Salamanca Doctor from Perjury, and contains the Narrative of his travels, Oates's depositions, and an account of the trial between him and Elliot. It was more ingenious than veracious, and the Narrative was burlesqued by Bartholomew Lane, a partisan of Oates, in A Vindication of Dr. Titus Oates from two Scurrilous Libels (1683).
