= John Watson (antiquary) =

English clergyman and antiquary

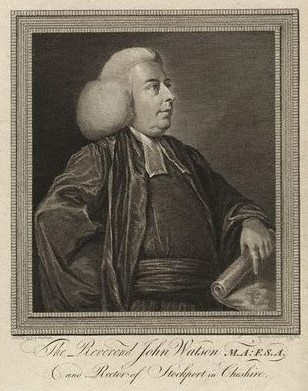
- John Watson, 1785 engraving by James Basire, after Daniel Stringer
- Born: 26 March 1725; Lyme Handley
- Died: 14 March 1783 (aged 57); Stockport
- Spouse(s): Susanna Watson (1752), Ann Watson (1761)
- Children: Two sons, one daughter
- Parent(s): Legh Watson (father), Hester Watson (mother)

John Watson (1725–1783) was an English clergyman and antiquary.

== Life ==
The son of Legh Watson of Lyme Handley in the parish of Prestbury, Cheshire, by his wife Hester, daughter of John Yates of Swinton, Lancashire, he was born at Lyme Handley on 26 March 1725, and educated at the grammar schools of Eccles, Wigan and Manchester. He matriculated from Brasenose College, Oxford, 8 April 1742, graduating B.A. 1745 and M.A. 1748. On 27 June 1746 he was elected to a Cheshire fellowship of his college.

In December 1746 Watson took holy orders and entered on the curacy of Runcorn, Cheshire; but moved three months later to Ardwick, Manchester, where he was also tutor to the sons of Samuel Birch. From 1750 to 1754 he was curate of Halifax, Yorkshire, and in September 1754 was presented to the perpetual curacy of Ripponden in Halifax parish. On 17 August 1766 he was inducted to the rectory of Miningsby, Lincolnshire, which he resigned on 2 August 1769 on being promoted to the rectory of Stockport, Cheshire. It was believed that he owed his preferment to hardline Whig views. He died at Stockport on 14 March 1783.

== Works ==
He was elected Fellow of the Society of Antiquaries in 1759, and contributed six papers on Roman and other antiquities to Archæologia. His major works were: The History and Antiquities of the Parish of Halifax, 1775, 4to, a second edition of which was begun in 1869 by F. A. Leyland, but left unfinished; and Memoirs of the Ancient Earls of Warren and Surrey and their Descendants, Warrington, 1782, 2 vols.. The latter was heavily illustrated attempt to prove that Watson's patron, Sir George Warren, was entitled to the earldom of Warenne and Surrey. Two earlier limited editions were printed in 1776 and 1779.

He also published four pamphlets between 1751 and 1764, one of them criticising the ‘absurdities’ of the Moravian hymn-book. He made extensive manuscript collections relating to local history, particularly of Cheshire, which were preserved, and were used by George Ormerod, John Parsons Earwaker, and other antiquaries. Gilbert Wakefield, who was Watson's curate at Stockport and married his niece, describes him as one of the hardest students he ever knew, as well as an agreeable man. In the Palatine Note-book (i. 24) is an account of a visit paid to Watson in 1780 by Thomas Barritt.

== Family ==
He was twice married: first, on 1 June 1752, to Susanna, daughter of Samuel Allon, vicar of Sandbach, Cheshire; secondly, on 11 July 1761, to Ann, daughter of James Jacques of Leeds. He left one son by the first wife, and a son and daughter by the second.
