= USS Little Rock =

USS Little Rock may refer to the following ships of the United States Navy:

- USS Little Rock (CL-92), a Cleveland-class cruiser launched in 1945, converted to a Galveston-class cruiser in the late 1950s, and serving in that capacity as CLG-4 and CG-4 until decommissioning on 22 November 1976. It is currently part of the museum at Buffalo and Erie County Naval & Military Park.
- USS Little Rock (LCS-9), is a Freedom-class littoral combat ship launched in 2015 and commissioned in 2017.
