= Reaching Out MBA =

American LGBTQ organization

Reaching Out MBA, Inc. (ROMBA) is a 501(c)(3) non-profit organization that empowers LGBT+ MBA students and LGBT+ MBA graduates to become professionals who will lead the way to equality in business education, the workplace and throughout society. The organization seeks to educate, inspire and connect lesbian, gay, bisexual, and transgender graduate business students and school clubs through its year round events. This programming anchored by the annual Reaching Out LGBTQ MBA & Business Graduate Conference, which is held each year in October and brings together over 1,800 LGBT+ MBAs and other business graduate students and over 90 corporate partners.

ROMBA was first granted non-profit status by the IRS in 2004, though the annual conference has been going on since 1999.

== Organization ==
Reaching Out MBA, Inc. (ROMBA) is a 501(c)(3) non-profit managed by a full-time Executive Director, two full-time staff members, and overseen by a 10-member independent Board of Directors. The Board of Directors positions include President, Secretary, and Treasurer; additionally there are six other Directors. Each member of the Board of Directors has participated as a leader for ROMBA programming.

The organization hosts year-round events anchored by the Annual Reaching Out LGBTQ MBA & Graduate Conference, which attracts over 1,800 attendees annually with representation from 100 business school programs and over 90 corporate partners. The content of the annual Reaching Out LGBTQ MBA Conference is arranged by a team of current MBA students competitively selected from business schools across the globe.

In 2014 the organization, in coordination with top global business schools, launched the LGBTQ MBA Fellowship, a scholarship and leadership development program designed to foster the next generation of business leaders. Each ROMBA Fellow receives a minimum $10,000 per year scholarship as well as customized leadership training and mentorship. As of the 2017-2018 application cycle 41 schools participate in the program.

Another key program is the annual Reaching Out LGBTQ MBA Club Leadership Summit, which brings together rising LGBTQ MBA club leaders from business schools around the globe to network, discuss issues they are facing and develop solutions.

In late 2015, the organization announced that it would be operating the Friendfactor MBA Challenge program and integrate it into its existing on-campus LGBT MBA club program.

== Annual Reaching Out LGBT MBA & Business Graduate Conference ==
Each year since 1999, the Reaching Out LGBTQ MBA & Graduate Conference (referred to as the ROMBA Conference) has been held in a major American city, and has been organized by a team of current MBA students from institutions all over the USA. The conference is planned and executed solely by unpaid volunteers each year. Over the course of the years, the conference size has grown dramatically, with recent years' attendance approaching or exceeding 1400. The conference includes opportunities for attendees to network with peers, learn by attending the panel sessions and guest lectures, and explore career opportunities by connecting with sponsor companies in the career expo. Each year over 90 companies, generally Fortune 500 companies, return to sponsor the conference each year, and use the conference as an opportunity to recruit LGBTQ MBA talent in the career expo portion of the event. The 2018 Conference was hosted in Minneapolis, Minnesota, with special guest-speaker RuPaul Andre Charles.

== LGBTQ MBA Fellowship & Scholarship ==
In Fall 2014 the organization announced the Reaching Out LGBT MBA Fellowship. This LGBT MBA scholarship program was created as a joint effort between top business school programs and ROMBA to demonstrate that business schools are outstanding opportunities for out LGBT young professionals and their active allies to build their careers. The Fellowship recipients will receive a minimum of $10,000 scholarship for each academic year, and also receive access to various ROMBA programming, mentoring and LGBTQA leadership opportunities, some of which would be developed specifically for these Fellows.

The founding schools (with an entry Class in fall 2015) include Boston University Questrom School, Booth School of Business, Carnegie Mellon Tepper School of Business, Columbia Business School, Duke Fuqua School of Business, Harvard Business School, Haas School of Business, Kellogg School of Management, McCombs School of Business, MIT Sloan School of Management, New York University Stern School of Business, Rice University Jones School of Business, University of Toronto, Rotman School of Management, Tuck School of Business at Dartmouth, UCLA Anderson School of Management, UNC Kenan-Flagler Business School, and Yale School of Management.

The Fellows admitted for the fall of 2017 will cumulatively receive over $2.5 million from their schools. As of the 2017-2018 application cycle, 41 business schools across the globe were participating.

== Case Library ==
ROMBA maintains a library of cases dealing with LGBT issues in business. As of Fall 2014, the library includes thirteen cases including the Harvard Business Publishing case on Lisa Sherman taught regularly at business schools worldwide. The annual ROMBA Case Writing Competition provides an opportunity for students, faculty, and/or professionals to contribute compelling cases to expand the library as well.
