= Arthur Elliot (artist) =

English painter

Arthur Elliot (1809–1892) was an English artist who sketched dozens of lively pictures of Montreal, Quebec, Canada, during his visit there from September 1881 to March 1882. He had a sharp eye for the details of daily life and recorded them with an equally sharp wit. The winter months, in particular, were of interest to Elliot, who recorded the various sleighs and the winter dress of Montréalers, and painted charming watercolours of skating carnivals and of children sledding on city streets.

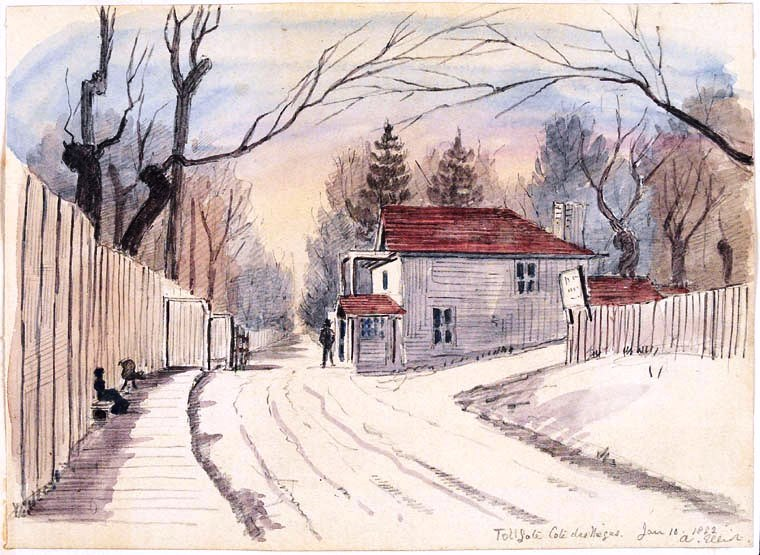

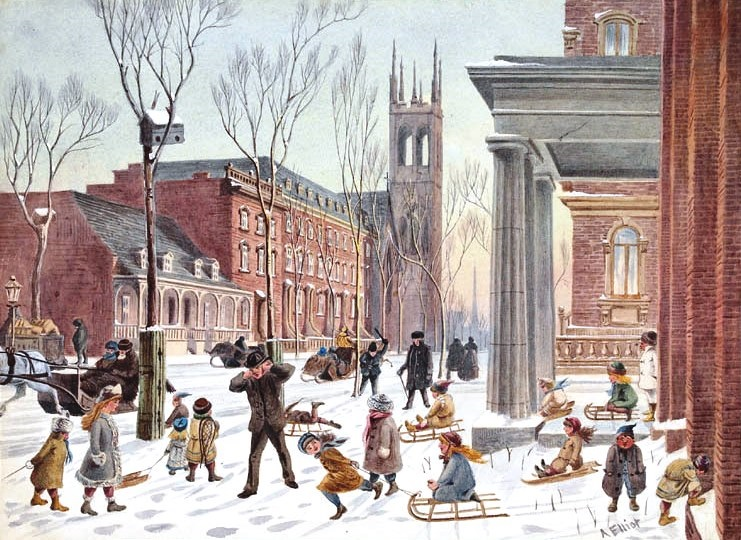
