= Adam Elliot (missionary) =

Adam Elliot (baptised 19 December 1802 – died 4 June 1878) was a British Church of England missionary who ministered to First Nations tribes in Ontario, Canada.
