= Camp Kesem =

US nonprofit organization

- Logo of Camp Kesem
- Formation: 2000
- Founder: Iris Rave Wedeking
- Type: Nonprofit organization
- Headquarters: Covina, California, U.S.
- Region served: United States
- Services: Free summer camps and support for children impacted by a parent’s cancer
- Website: www.kesem.org

Kesem is a national 501(c)(3) organization that supports children aged 6–18 who are affected by a parent's cancer. It provides year-round programs and services to support these children at no cost to families, and has a presence at more than 130 colleges and university chapters in 44 states and the District of Columbia. Kesem is funded by donations from individuals, foundations, and corporations.

== Activities ==
Kesem's flagship program, Camp Kesem, is a free week-long sleepaway summer camp for kids whose parents have or have had cancer. The camp is designed for kids to have fun and build connections with each other and counselors. Campers are grouped with peers their age. The campers transition through rotations that include traditional camp activities like arts and crafts, sports, or nature-themed activities. Campers also gather in their cabin for “Cabin Chat" at the end of the day, where they can share about anything on their mind. On one specific day, the campers share their stories about their parent's cancer.

Throughout the year, Kesem also provides year-round services including care packages, personalized greetings, birthday cards, local gatherings, leadership groups, and affinity groups for campers and their families.

== History ==
The first Camp Kesem chapter was founded at Stanford University in 2000 as a project of Hillel at Stanford, a nonprofit serving Jewish students at the university. The project was developed by founder Iris Rave Wedeking, and a group of student leaders who sought to create a summer camp experience for children in need for little to no cost for the families.

After assessing the needs of the community, the students found that children who have, or have had, a parent with cancer comprised an under-served population who could benefit from a summer camp experience with peers who faced similar challenges.

Camp Kesem at Stanford hosted its first summer session in June 2001, free of charge to 37 campers.

In August 2002, Iris Rave founded Camp Kesem National to share the project's model with college campuses across the nation.

== Impact ==
For the fiscal year 2024, Kesem served over 7,700 children affected by a parent's cancer. Nearly 4,800 student leaders volunteered for Kesem."Donor Impact Report" (PDF). 2024-03-17.

- 98% felt that their child made new friends at camp.
- 99% felt that their child felt included at Camp Kesem.
- 98% felt more confident in their children's ability to address their experiences with cancer because of Kesem.
- 99% would recommend Kesem to other families affected by cancer
- 99% felt Kesem gave their child a community of support

== Evaluations ==
Charity Navigator gave Kesem a 100.00, earning it a 4-Star rating, with the Finance category receiving 100.00, Culture and Community category receiving 100.00, and Accountability & Transparency receiving a score of 100.00.

Kesem is a recipient of Guidestar's 2024 Silver Seal of Transparency.

== Collegiate Chapters ==
=== A - F ===
- Kesem at Arizona State University
- Kesem at Auburn University
- Kesem at Augustana College
- Kesem at Ball State University
- Kesem at Bellarmine University
- Kesem at Berkeley
- Kesem at Boise State
- Kesem at Boston University
- Kesem at Bradley University
- Kesem at Brown University
- Kesem at California Polytechnic State University, San Luis Obispo
- Kesem at California State University - Sacramento
- Kesem at Carnegie Mellon University
- Kesem at Case Western Reserve University
- Kesem at Central PA
- Kesem at Chapman University
- Kesem at Chestnut Hill
- Kesem at Christopher Newport University
- Kesem at The Claremont Colleges
- Kesem at Clemson
- Kesem at Colorado State University
- Kesem at Columbia University
- Kesem at Cornell University
- Kesem at Dartmouth College
- Kesem at Denison University
- Kesem at DePaul University
- Kesem at Dixie State University
- Kesem at Duke University
- Kesem at East Atlanta
- Kesem at Florida Gulf Coast University
- Kesem at Florida International University
- Kesem at Florida State University
- Kesem at Fresno State

=== G - L ===
- Kesem at George Mason University
- Kesem at George Washington University
- Kesem at the University of Georgia
- Kesem at Grand Valley State University
- Kesem at Hamline University
- Kesem at Harvard Undergraduate
- Kesem at Indiana State University
- Kesem at Indiana University
- Kesem at Iowa
- Kesem at James Madison University
- Kesem at Johns Hopkins University
- Kesem at Long Beach State
- Kesem at Louisiana State University
- Kesem at Loyola Marymount University

=== M - R ===
- Kesem at Marquette University
- Kesem at Massachusetts Institute of Technology (MIT)
- Kesem at Miami of Ohio
- Kesem at Michigan State University
- Kesem at Middle Tennessee State University
- Kesem at Mississippi State University
- Kesem at Montana State University
- Kesem at New Mexico State University
- Kesem at New York University
- Kesem at North Carolina State University
- Kesem at Northern Arizona University
- Kesem at Northern Illinois University
- Kesem at Northwestern University
- Kesem at Nova Southeastern University
- Kesem at Ohio State University
- Kesem at Pepperdine University
- Kesem at Princeton University
- Kesem at Rice University
- Kesem at Rowan University

=== S - Y ===
- Kesem at Saint Louis University
- Kesem at San Diego State University
- Kesem at Santa Clara University
- Kesem at Seattle University
- Kesem at Southern Utah University
- Kesem at Stony Brook University
- Kesem at Syracuse University
- Kesem at Temple University
- Kesem at Teton Valley
- Kesem at Texas A&M University
- Kesem at Towson University
- Kesem at Tufts University
- Kesem at University of Alabama
- Kesem at University of Arizona
- Kesem at University of Arkansas
- Kesem at University of California-Davis
- Kesem at University of California-Irvine
- Kesem at University of California-Los Angeles
- Kesem at University of California-San Diego
- Kesem at University of California-Santa Barbara
- Kesem at University of California-Santa Cruz
- Kesem at University of Chicago
- Kesem at University of Cincinnati
- Kesem at University of Colorado Boulder
- Kesem at University of Connecticut
- Kesem at University of Florida
- Kesem at University of Houston
- Kesem at University of Illinois
- Kesem at University of Kansas
- Kesem at University of Kentucky
- Kesem at University of Maine
- Kesem at University of Maryland
- Kesem at University of Miami
- Kesem at University of Michigan
- Kesem at University of Minnesota
- Kesem at University of Missouri
- Kesem at University of Nebraska–Lincoln
- Kesem at University of Nevada, Las Vegas
- Kesem at University of Nevada, Reno
- Kesem at University of North Carolina-Chapel Hill
- Kesem at University of North Carolina–Greensboro
- Kesem at University of Notre Dame
- Kesem at University of Oklahoma
- Kesem at University of Oregon
- Kesem at University of Pennsylvania
- Kesem at University of Pittsburgh
- Kesem at University of Richmond
- Kesem at University of Rhode Island
- Kesem at University of San Francisco
- Kesem at University of South Alabama
- Kesem at University of Southern California
- Kesem at University of South Florida
- Kesem at University of Texas–Austin
- Kesem at University of Texas–Dallas
- Kesem at University of Toledo
- Kesem at University of Utah
- Kesem at University of Vermont
- Kesem at University of Virginia
- Kesem at University of Washington
- Kesem at University of Wisconsin–Madison
- Kesem at Utah Valley
- Kesem at Vanderbilt University
- Kesem at Virginia Commonwealth University
- Kesem at Virginia Tech
- Kesem at Washington University in St. Louis
- Kesem at Western Carolina University
- Kesem at West Virginia University
- Kesem at Whitworth University
- Kesem at William & Mary
- Kesem at Yale University
