= Batavia =

Batavia may refer to:

== Historical places ==
- Batavia (region), a land inhabited by the Batavian people during the Roman Empire, today part of the Netherlands
- Batavia, Dutch East Indies, present-day Jakarta, the former capital of the Dutch East Indies (1619–1949)
  - Old Batavia, the original downtown area of Jakarta
  - Jakarta, the modern-day city, capital of Indonesia
- Batavian Republic, the Netherlands from 1795 to 1806 as a French vassal state, Batavia being the Latin name of the Low countries
- Passau, Germany, called Batavis or Batavia by the Romans
- West Batavia, New York, a former hamlet and post office in Genesee County

== Modern places ==
=== United States ===
- Batavia, California, an unincorporated community in Solano County, California
- Batavia, Illinois, a city in Kane County, Illinois, named for the city in New York
- Batavia, Iowa, a city in Jefferson County, Iowa
- Batavia, Michigan, a community in Branch County, Michigan
- Batavia, New York, a city which is the county seat of Genesee County, New York, named for the region in the Netherlands
  - Batavia (town), New York, in Genesee County, New York
- Batavia Kill (Schoharie Creek tributary), a river in Greene County, New York
- Batavia, Ohio, a town and the county seat of Clermont County, Ohio
- Batavia, Wisconsin, an unincorporated community in Sheboygan County, Wisconsin
- Batavia Township (disambiguation), several communities

=== Elsewhere ===
- Batavia, Suriname, a former leper colony site in Suriname
- Batavia Coast, a region in Western Australia
- Batavia Road, an anchorage in Western Australia

== Transportation ==
- Batavia (1628 ship), a ship of the Dutch East India Company shipwrecked on her maiden voyage on the coast of Australia in 1629
  Batavia (1995 ship), a seaworthy replica of the same ship
- Batavia (1802 ship), an English ship
- Batavia Road (boat), one of the first boats used for a commercial tourist operation in the Houtman Abrolhos
- Batavia Air, an Indonesian airline

== Sport ==
- Batavia F.C., an Indonesian football club based in South Jakarta
- Batavia Union F.C., an Indonesian football club based in North Jakarta

== Other uses ==
- Batavia, a type of lettuce with broad flat leaves
- Batavia (cloth), an 18th-century silk fabric, popular for dress in France, made in Batavia now (Jakarta)
- Batavia (opera), by Richard Mills
- Batavia Institute, a registered historic place in Batavia, Illinois
- Batavia, a group of islands in Dougal Dixon's book After Man: A Zoology of the Future
- Batavia Knoll, a submerged microcontinent part of the Naturaliste Plateau

== See also ==
- Batavians, a Germanic tribe living during the Roman Empire in the area of the Rhine delta
- Batavi (disambiguation)
- Betawi (disambiguation)
- Betawi people, named after Batavia, Dutch East Indies
