= William Miller (engraver) =

Scottish engraver and watercolorist (1796–1882)

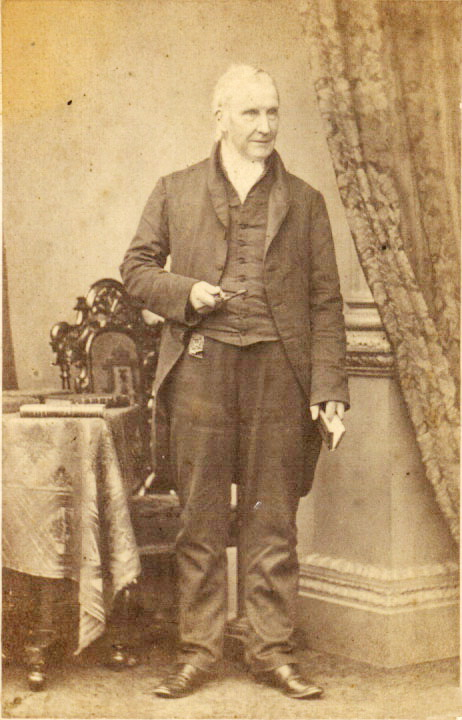
- Photograph of William Miller in circa 1862
- Born: 28 May 1796; Edinburgh, Scotland
- Died: 20 January 1882 (aged 85); Sheffield, England
- Spouses: Ellen Miller d.1841; Jane Miller

William Miller (28 May 1796 – 20 January 1882) was a Scottish Quaker line engraver and watercolourist from Edinburgh. Miller produces several engraving of plants which were published in several volumes of Loddiges Botanical Cabinet between 1820 and 1822. He was also one of the principal engravers of J. M. W. Turner.

== Life ==
Miller became an apprentice to William Archibald in 1814. His first published engraving was in that year, of an apple tree for William Archibald. This engraving appeared in Vol I of the Royal Caledonian Horticultural Society. He spent four years with William Archibald, then set up on his own account. At the end of 1819, he moved to Hackney to join the workshop of George Cooke. The premium paid for his 18-month stay with Cooke was £240. Other apprentices with Cooke included William Shotter Boys. In the 1830s his address was listed as 4 Hope Park, in the Meadows area of Edinburgh.

== Works ==
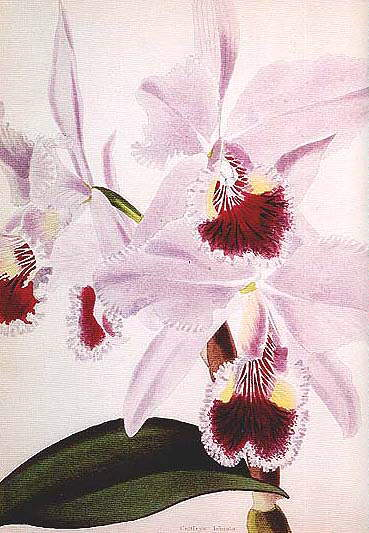
Cattleya labiata 2, from Jefferson's Legacy, the collection of Library of Congress (Loddiges & Sons', The Botanical Cabinet. London, 1817–1833)

Whilst an apprentice with Cooke, Miller drew a series of plants from the neighbouring nursery of Loddiges. These were engraved by Cooke and published in volumes v–vii of Loddiges Botanical Cabinet (London, J. and A. Arch, 1820–1822). Miller was one of the principal engravers of J. M. W. Turner. His engravings after Turner included Portsmouth, Clovelly Bay and Comb Martin.

James Giles, one of William Miller's pupils, wrote some reminiscences of his time as an apprentice at Hope Park. Writing from Redhill on 17 September 1883 (published privately in Memorials of Hope Park):

Wm Miller's admiration of Turner was unbounded, and his pupils soon caught the infection. The drawings, which at first sight looked so mysterious and unintelligible, the more they were pondered, unfolded their wondrous meaning and beauty; and from my own experience I can testify, that sitting for weeks before the same drawing, I did not tire over them, as was the case with inferior pictures.....The plates executed from 1833 to 1836 consisted of the illustrations to Scott's Works, Turner's 'Annual Tour', Gainsborough's 'Watering Place', a large Venice, by Turner and, of course, some plates of less note. The plates for Rogers's poems were engraved before my time, but not published till afterwards; these are probably the most exquisite gems that ever were, or ever will be produced.

Large single prints by Miller after Turner include The Grand Canal for Hodgson and Graves, 1837; Modern Italy for F G Moon, issued as the Presentation Plate for the National Art Union in 1843; and The Rhine, Osterprey and Feltzen for D T White in 1852. His last engraved work was a series of vignettes after Myles Birket Foster to illustrate two volumes of the poems of Thomas Hood, published by Moxon in 1871 and 1872.

Works in Loddiges Botanical Cabinet

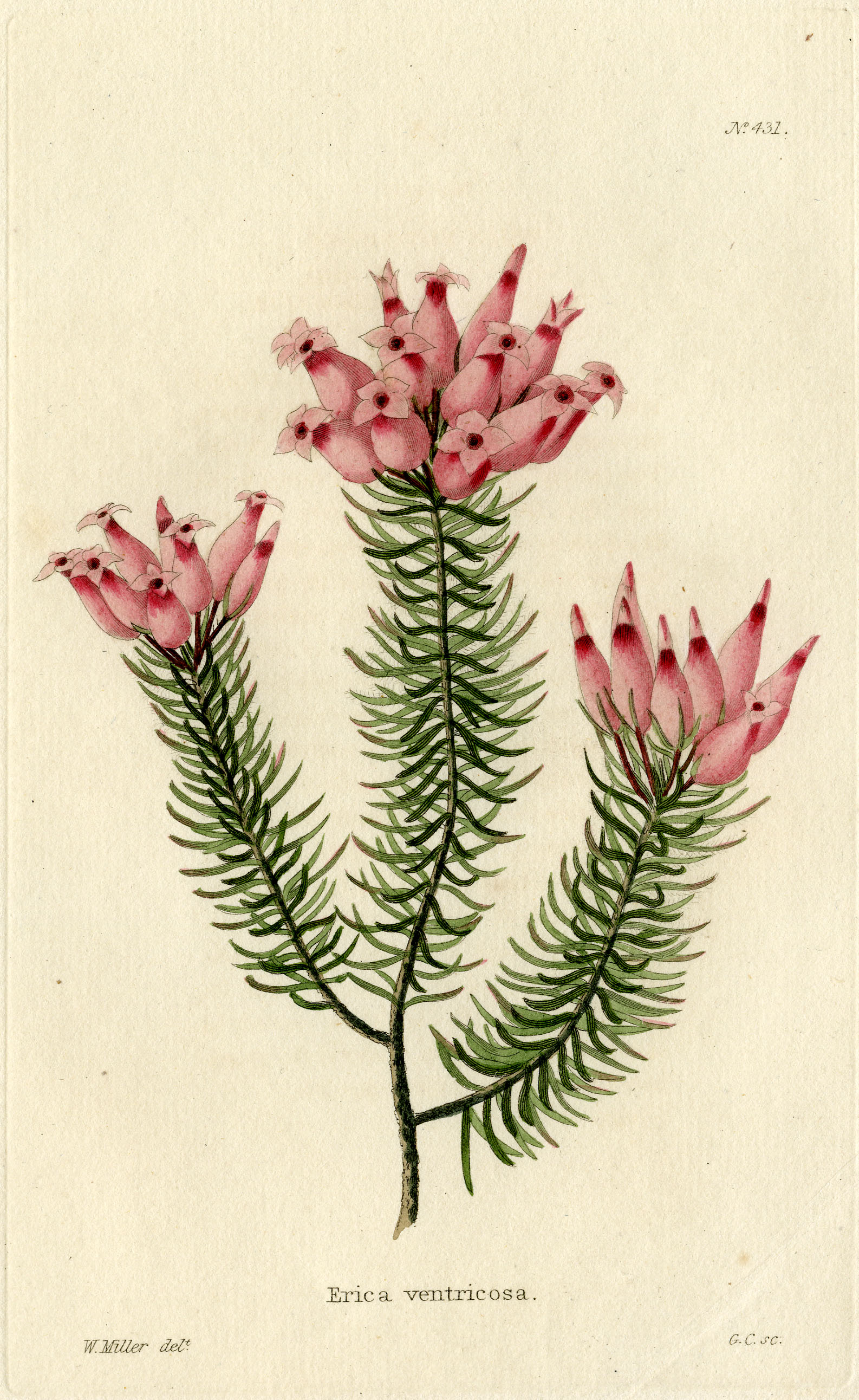
431 Erica ventricosa

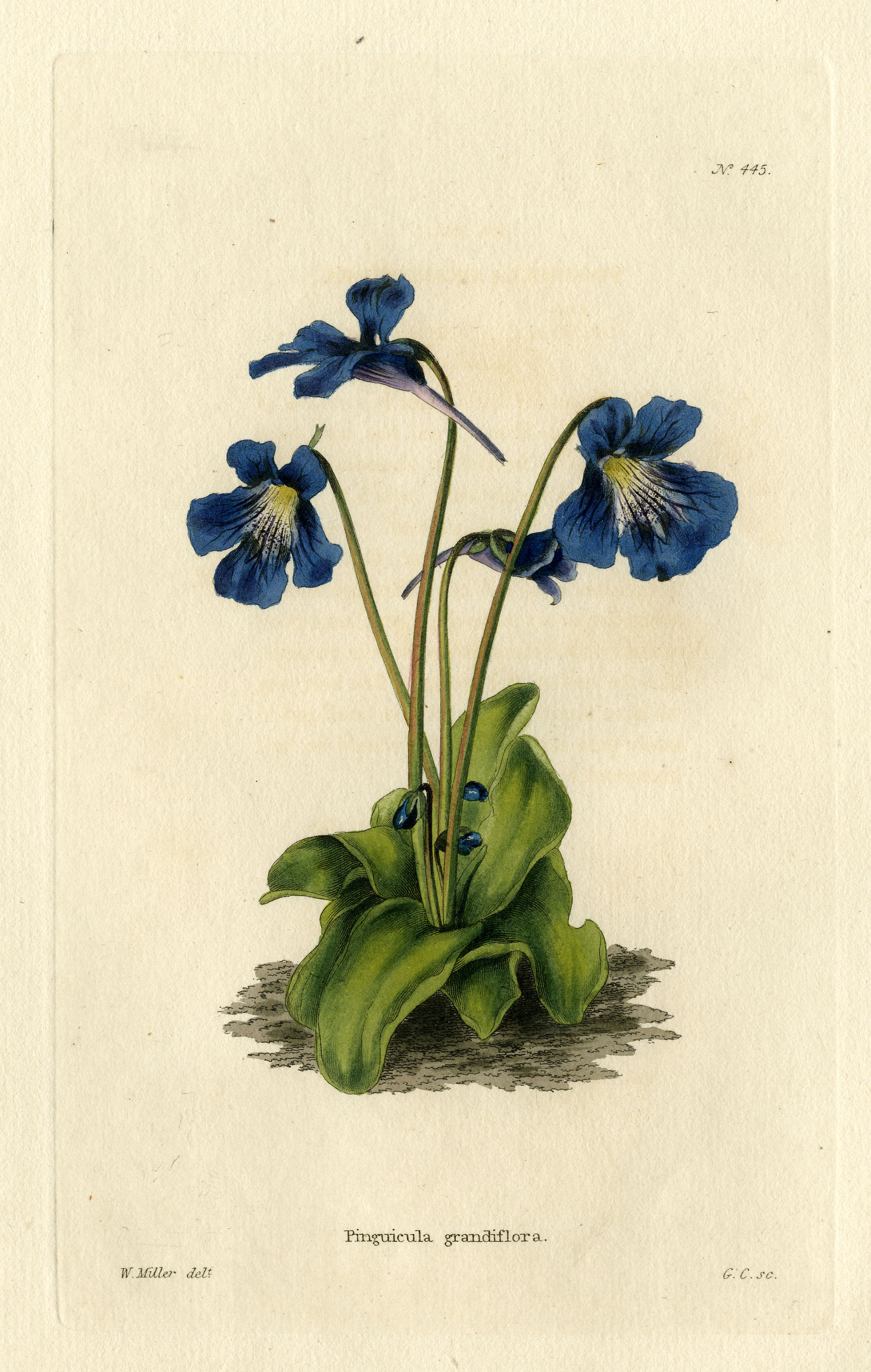
445 Pinguicula grandiflora

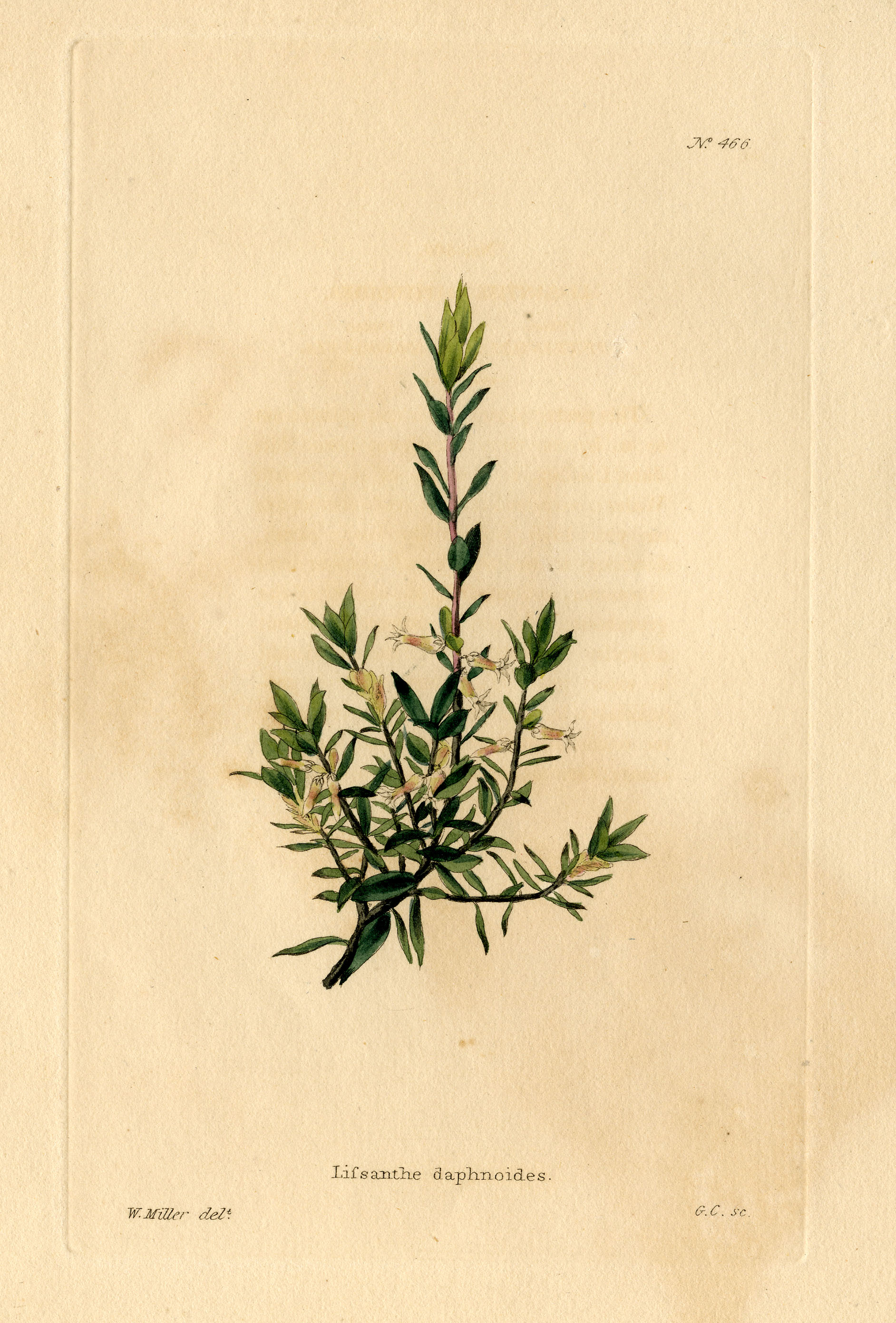
466 Lissanthe daphnoides

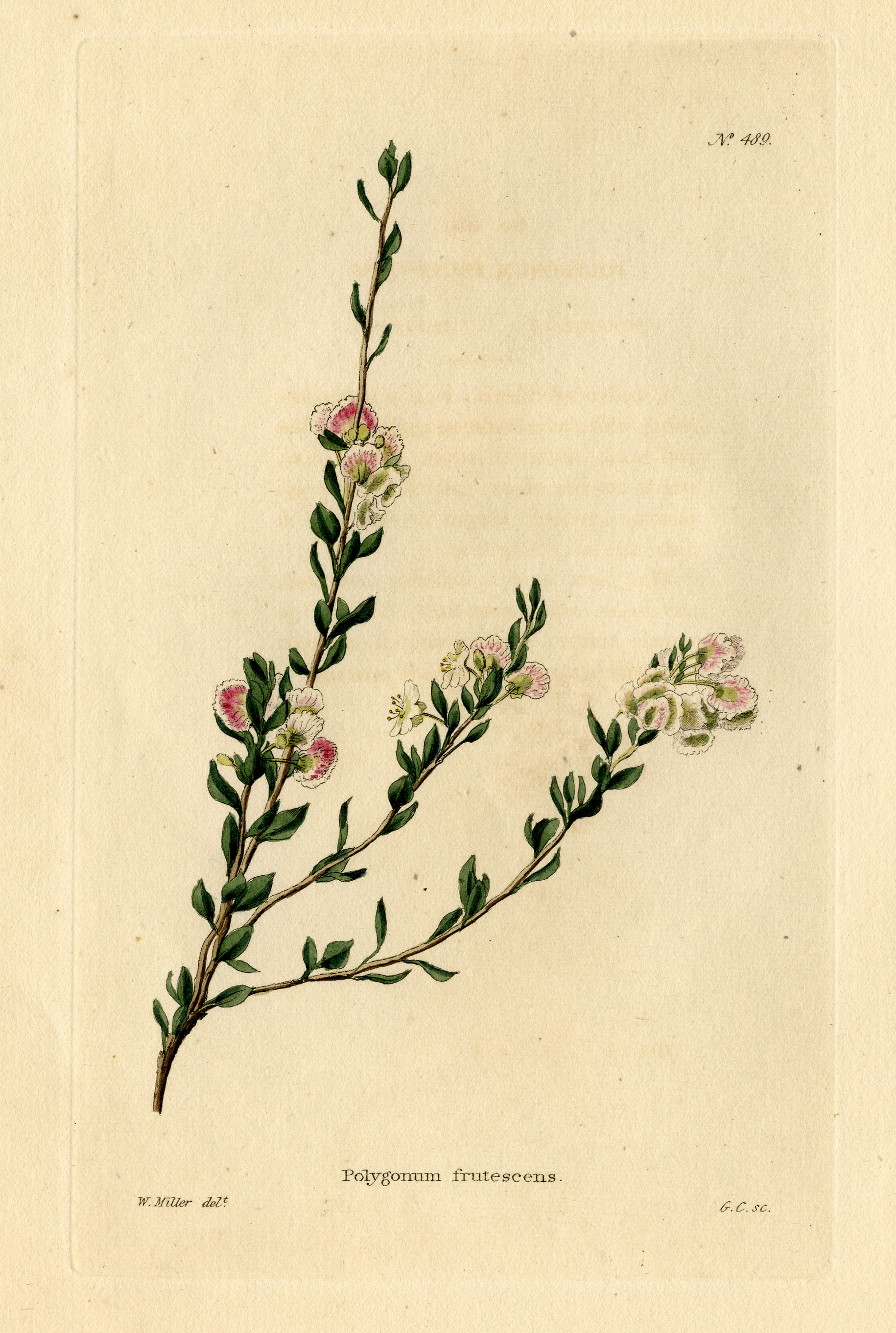
489 Polygonum frutescens (Atraphaxis frutescens)

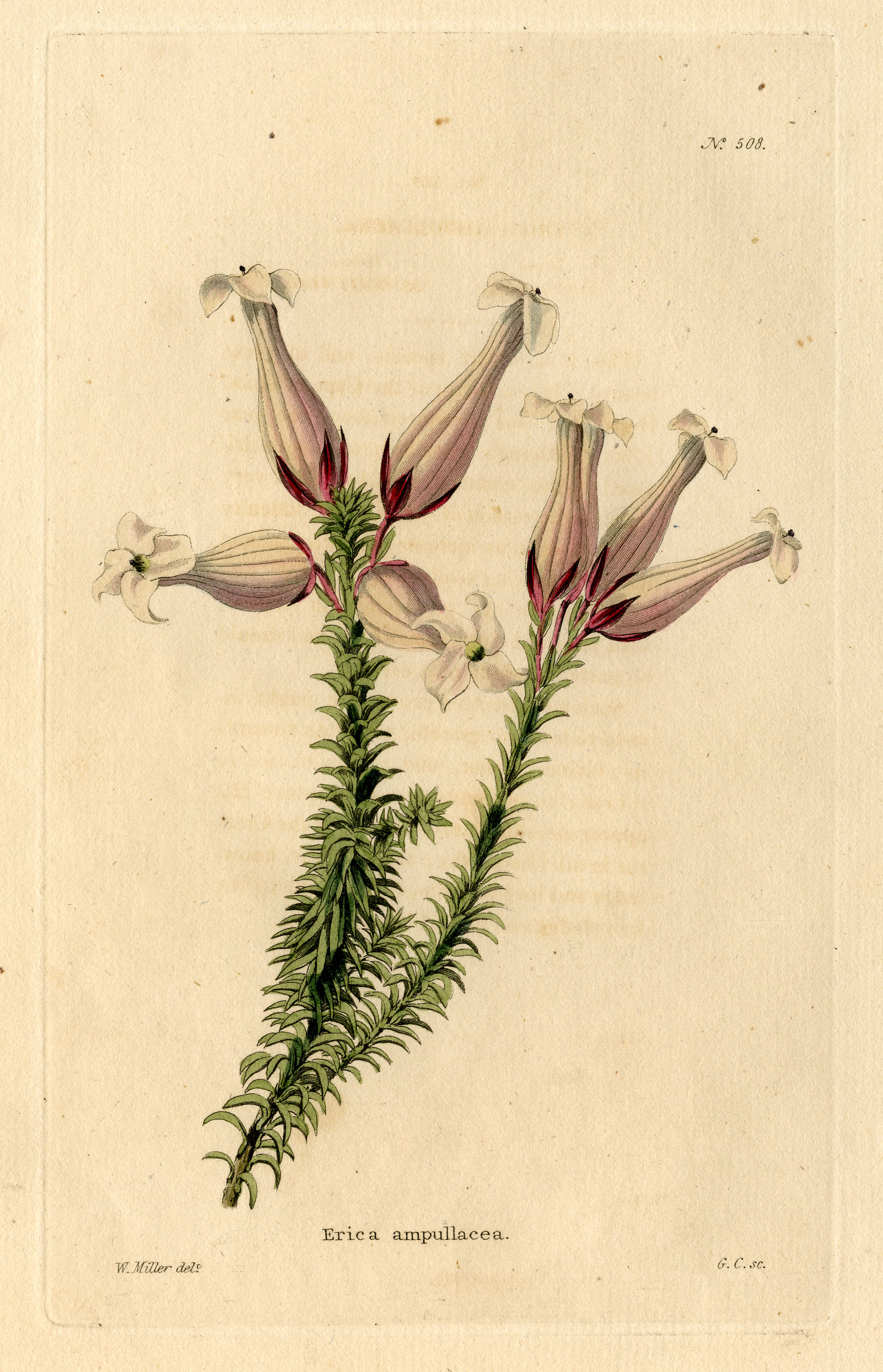
508 Erica ampullacea

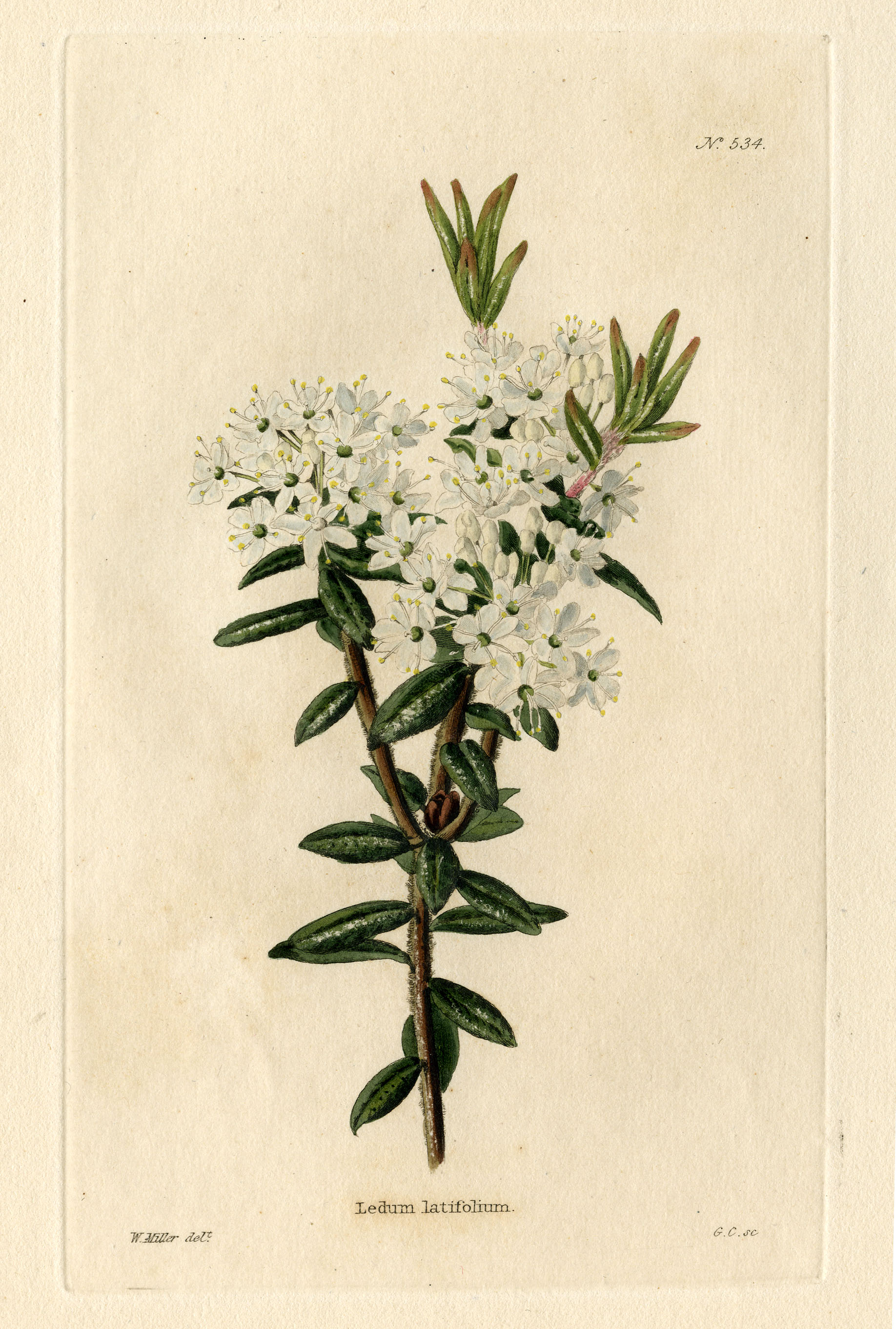
534 Ledum latifolium

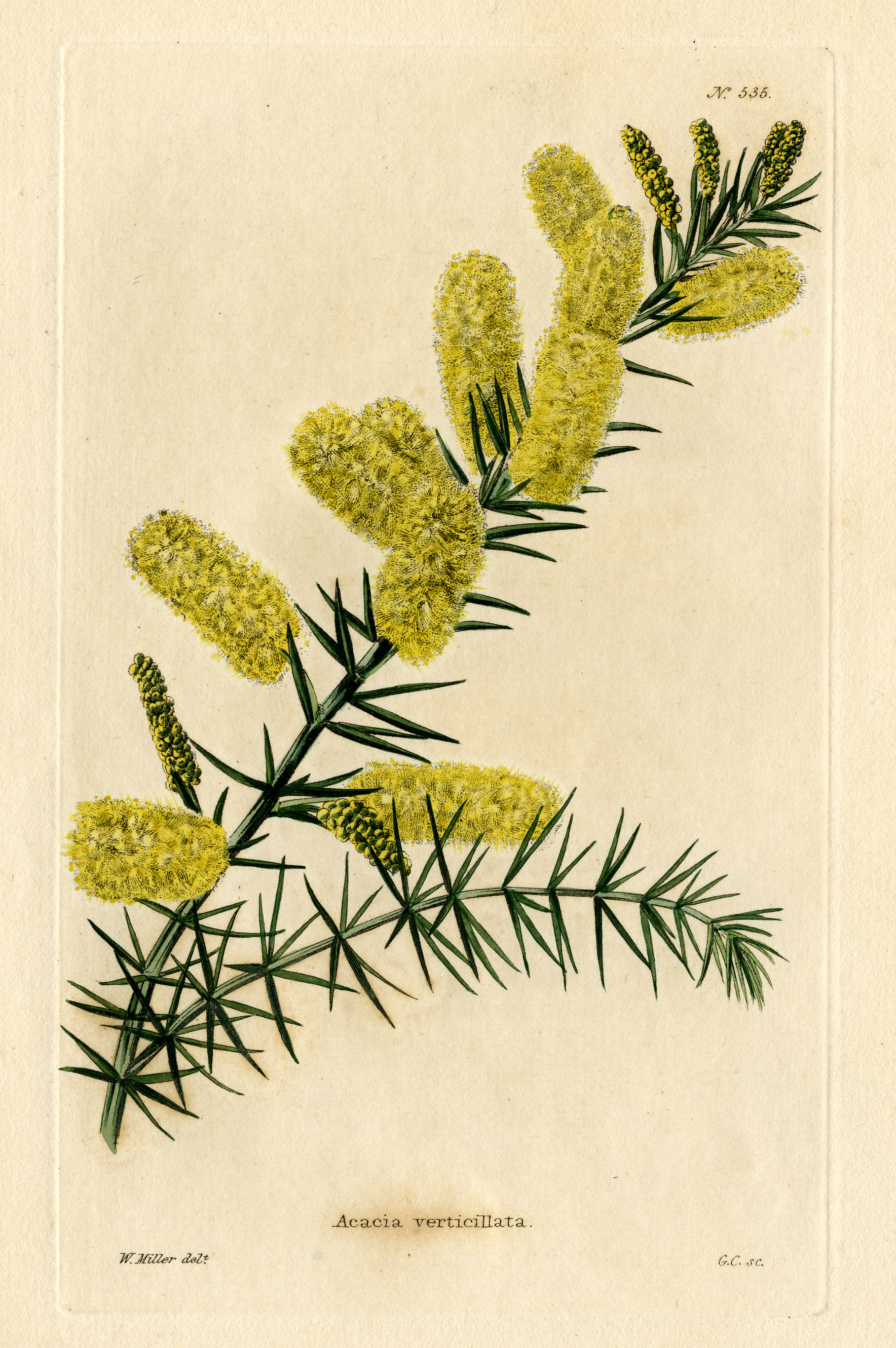
535 Acacia verticillata

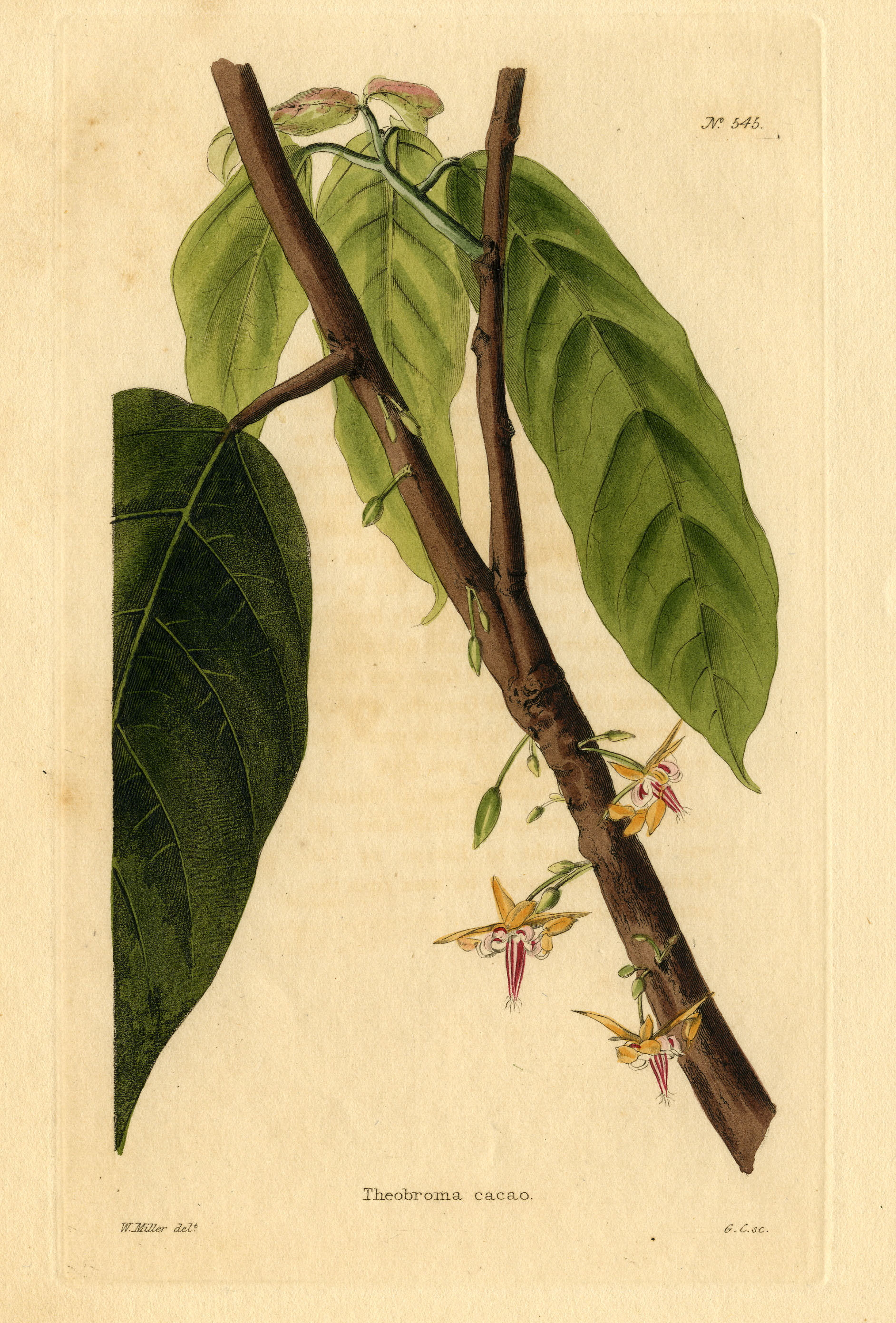
545 Theobroma cacao

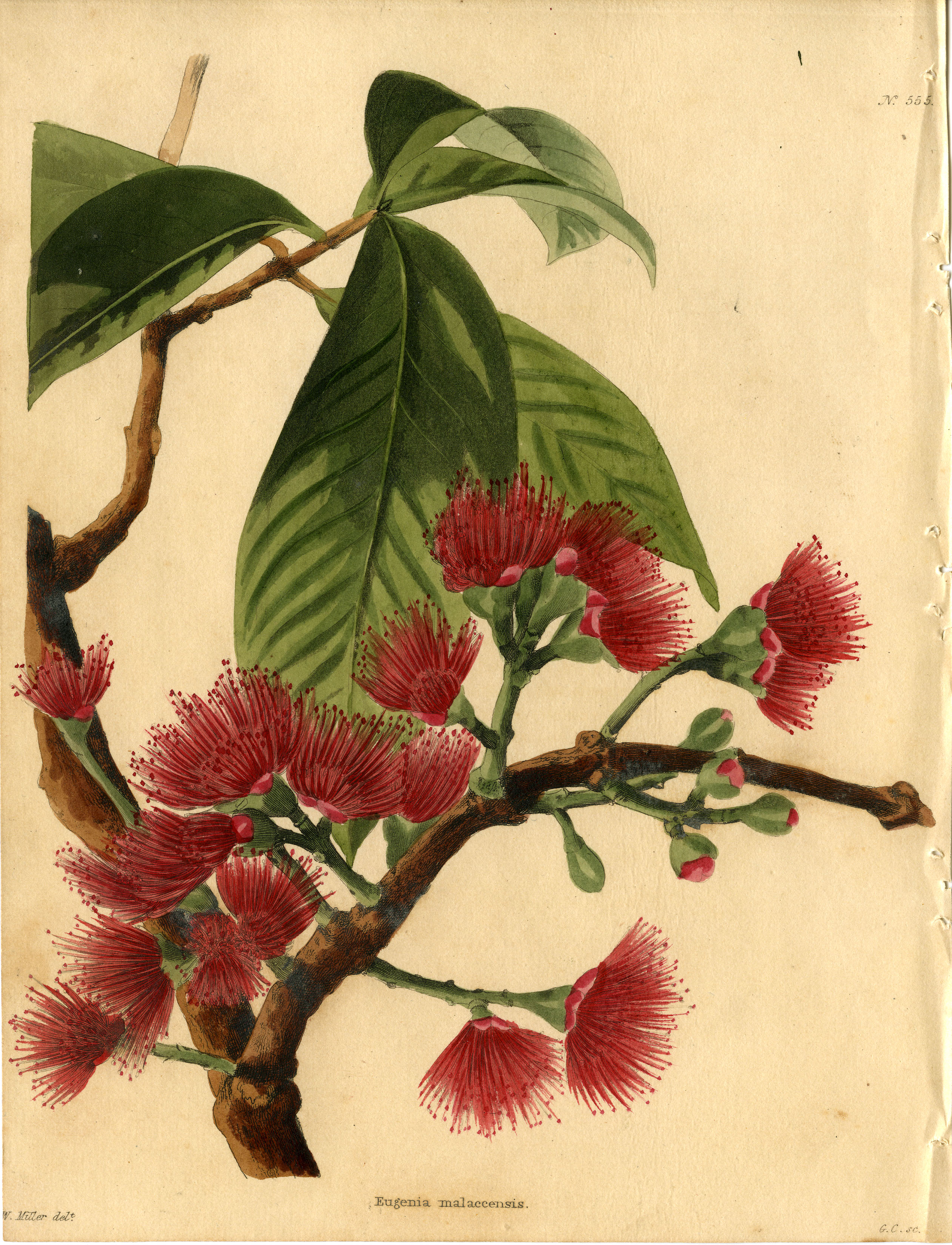
555 Eugenia malaccensis

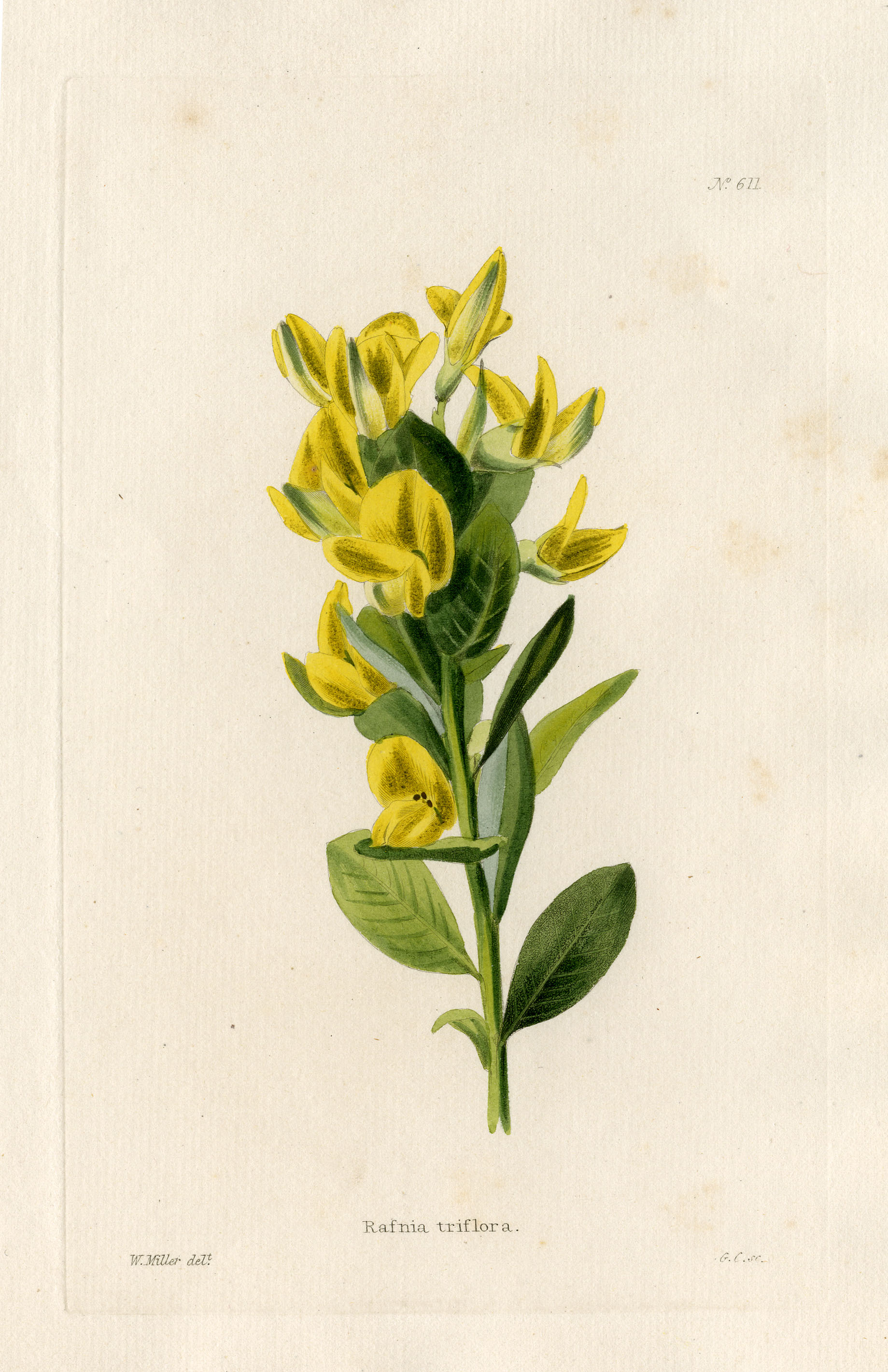
611 Rafnia triflora

== Selected works ==
Some of illustrated works by Miller include:

- Memoirs of the Caledonian Horticultural Society Volume First. Edinburgh: Printed by Neill & Co. for Archibald Constable and Company; and for Longman, Hurst, Rees, Orme and Brown, London, 1814.
- Encyclopædia Britannica 5th Edition, at the Encyclopaedia Press, For Archibald Constable and Company, and Thomson Bonar, Edinburgh: Gale, Curtis, and Fenner, London; and Thomas Wilson and Sons, York, 1817.
- The Botanical Cabinet Consisting of Coloured Delineations of Plants from all countries. Plates by George Cooke. Conrad Loddiges. London: John & Arthur Arch, 1818.
- Engravings of the Skeleton of the Human Body. John Gordon MD. Blackwood, Edinburgh: 1818.
- Scottish Cryptogamic Flora or Coloured Figures and Descriptions of Cryptogamic Plants, belonging chiefly to the Order Fungi; and Intended to serve as a Continuation of English Botany. Robert Kaye Greville. Edinburgh: Printed (by P. Neill) for MacLachlan & Stewart, Edinburgh; and Baldwin, Cradock & Joy, London, 1823-1828 (Plesch 301; Margadant, Greville 5; Nissen 757).
- An Essay on Gothic Architecture by T. Rickman, Architect. Third edn. Thomas Rickman. Liverpool: Geo. Smith. 1825.
- Select Views In Greece With Classical Illustrations. Williams, Hugh William. London: Longman Rees Orme Brown and Green; and Adam Black. 1829
- The Morbid Anatomy of the Gullet, Stomach and Intestines. Alexander Monro, tertius. Second Edition. Edinburgh: John Carfrae and Son; and Longman, Rees, Orme, Brown and Green, London. 1830
- The Literary Souvenir for 1832. Alaric A Watts. London, Longman, Rees, Orme, Brown and Green, 1832
- Lyrics of the Heart and Other Poems. Alaric A. Watts. London: Longman, Brown, Green and Longmans. 1851
- Views In The East comprising India, Canton. and The Shores of The Red Sea with Historical and Descriptive Illustrations. Elliot, Captain Robert R.N. H. Fisher, Son & Co., Newgate Street, London 1833
