= Bedawi =

Bedawi may refer to:

- Northwest Arabian Arabic, or Bedawi Arabic
- Beja language, also called Bedawi
- Western Egyptian Bedawi Arabic

== See also ==
- Betawi (disambiguation)
