= Batavi =

Batavi may refer to:

- Batavi (Germanic tribe)
  - Revolt of the Batavi
  - Batavi (military unit)
- Batavi (album), album by Dutch pagan/folk metal band Heidevolk

== See also ==
- Batavia (disambiguation)
- Betawi (disambiguation)
