= Batavia Township =

Batavia Township may refer to the following places in the United States:

- Batavia Township, Boone County, Arkansas
- Batavia Township, Kane County, Illinois
- Batavia Township, Branch County, Michigan
- Batavia Township, Ohio

== See also ==
- Batavia (disambiguation)
- Batavia (town), New York
