= Robert Elliot (Royal Navy officer) =

Robert James Elliott (born 12 May 1790 Wheldrake, Yorkshire – died Pentonville, London 30 April 1849) (fl. 1822–1833), was an English naval officer, Captain in the Royal Navy, and known as a topographical draughtsman from 1822 to 1824.

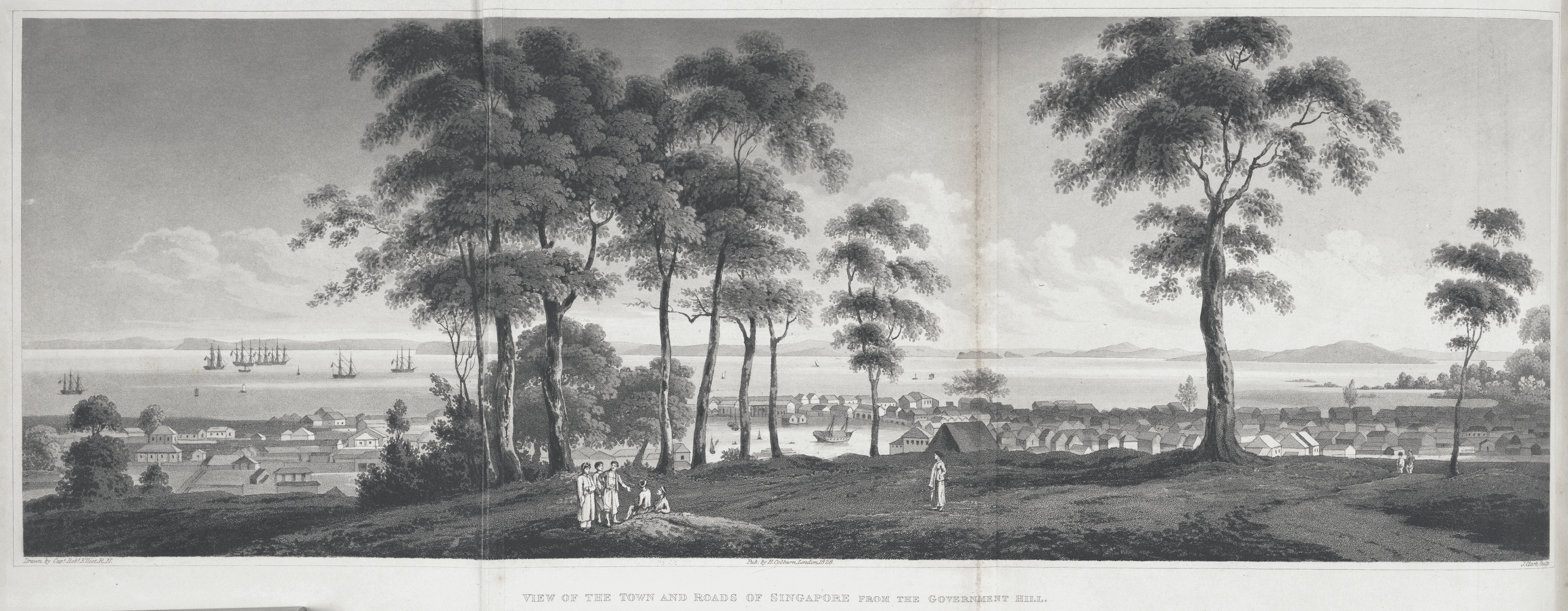
Engraved view of the town and roads of Singapore from government hill, from an Elliot sketch

== Biography ==
Elliot (Elliott) was the son of the Reverend Robert Elliot and Mary. His father was a younger brother of Gilbert Elliot-Murray-Kynynmound, 1st Earl of Minto, the Governor-General of India between 1807 and 1813. His cousin, Minto's son, George served during the same period.

He entered the Royal Navy as a Cadet in 1802, and served his country with honour during the Napoleonic War. His name appeared in the London Gazette in 1807, and he was made a lieutenant for his gallantry in charge of the boats of the Fox, in 1808 when he was severely wounded in trying to cut out a ship from Batavia Roads.

Promoted to Lieutenant in 1808, and from then to 1814 he served in the East Indies. He was made Commander on 27 August 1814. From 1822 to 1824 he was in command of a vessel that toured India, Canton, and the Red Sea during this period he made numerous on the spot sketches.

When in London on retirement, he busied himself with charity work for benefiting sailors, and support for a sailors' home. The Sailors' Home, Well-street, was originally founded in 1828 by Captain R. J. Elliot, R.N., Admiral G. C. Gambier, and Lieut. R. Justice, R.N., who, in the previous year, had successfully started the Destitute Sailors' Asylum; the destruction of the Brunswick Theatre in Well-street affording the opportunity for carrying out the scheme. Up to that time nothing had been done for the protection of seamen.

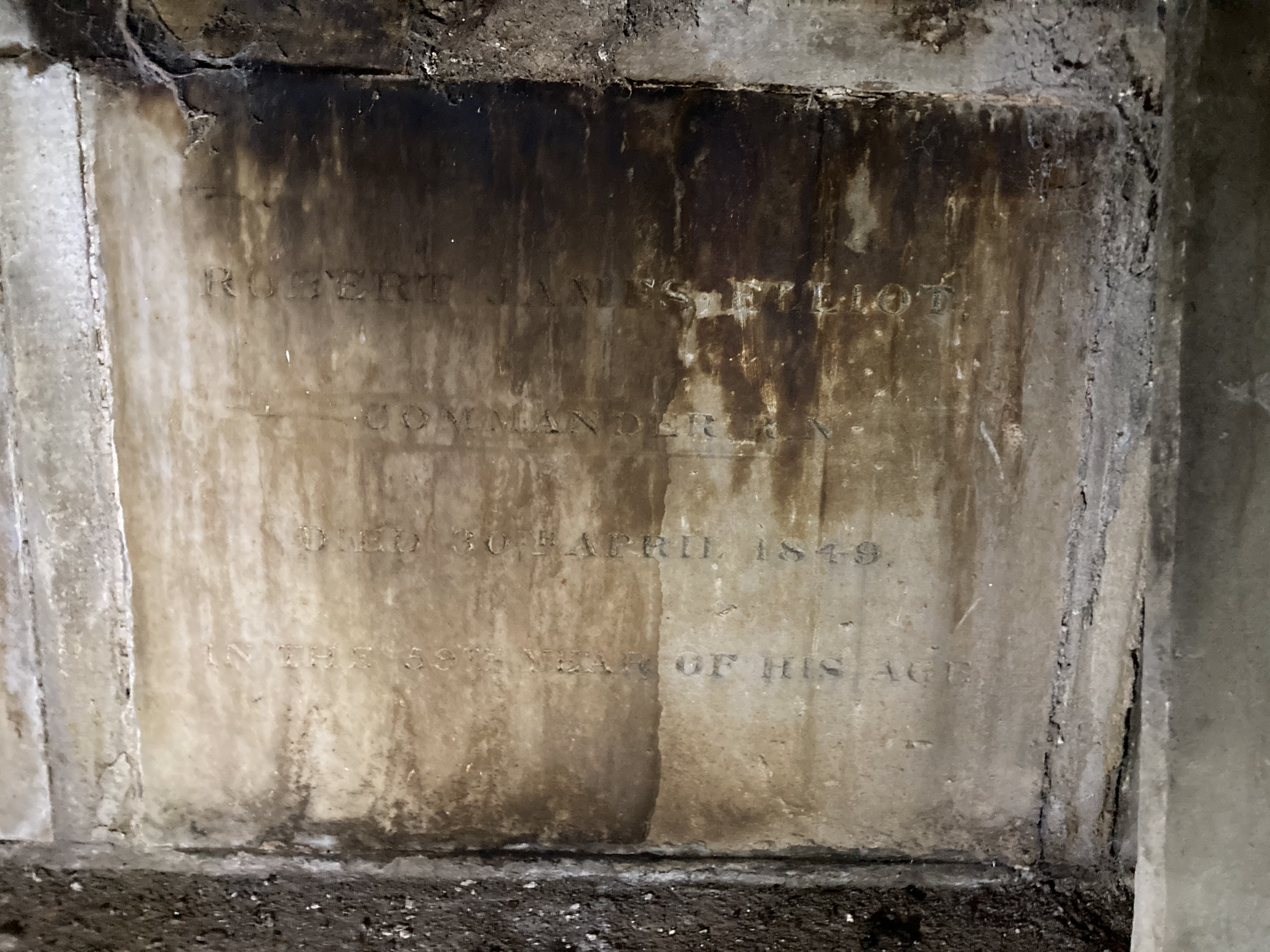
Loculus of Robert Elliot in the Terrace Catecombs of Highgate Cemetery

In 1846 he was awarded the commander's out pension of Greenwich Hospital. He died at Pentonville on 30 April 1849 and was interred in the Terrace Catacombs of Highgate Cemetery.

Some of the sketches he had made on his travels were published under the title View in the East in 1833. In that edition, the letterpress descriptions were drawn from a variety of published works, including Amelia Heber's posthumous edition of Reginald Heber's Narrative of a Journey through the Upper Provinces of India (1828). In the 1835 edition, the publishers Fisher & Co. commissioned Emma Roberts to write new letterpress.

These sketches were worked up by Samuel Prout, Clarkson Stanfield, and others into finished drawings and consequently engraved; they were published in parts by Fisher & Co., appearing 1830–1833, under the title, Views in the East, comprising India, Canton, and the Red Sea, with Historical and Descriptive Letterpress by Emma Roberts.

Views in India, China, and on the Shores of the Red Sea was published in 1835.

== Gallery ==
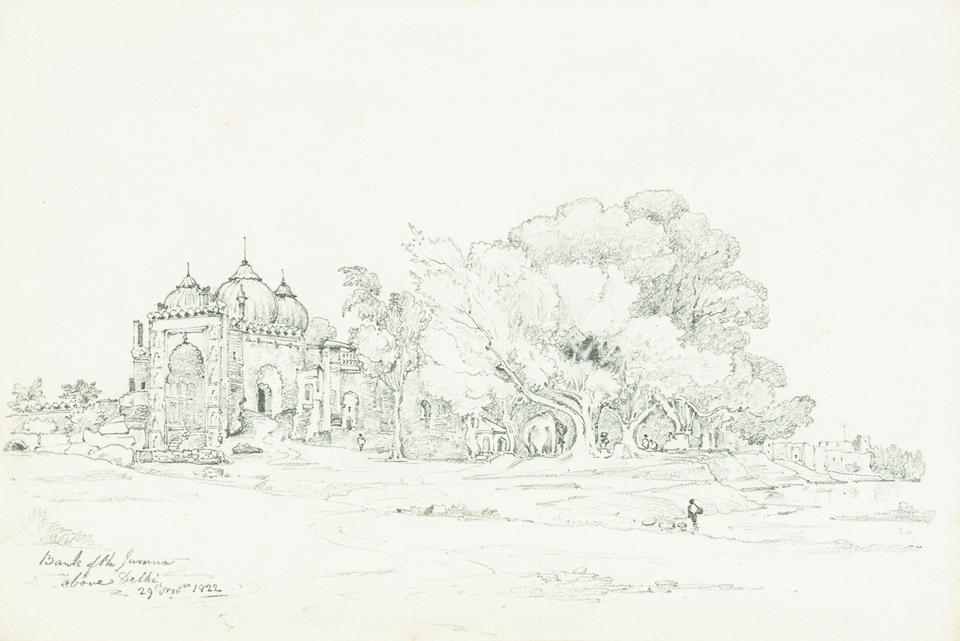
A sketch by Elliot of a ruined Mosque in Delhi on the banks of Jumna

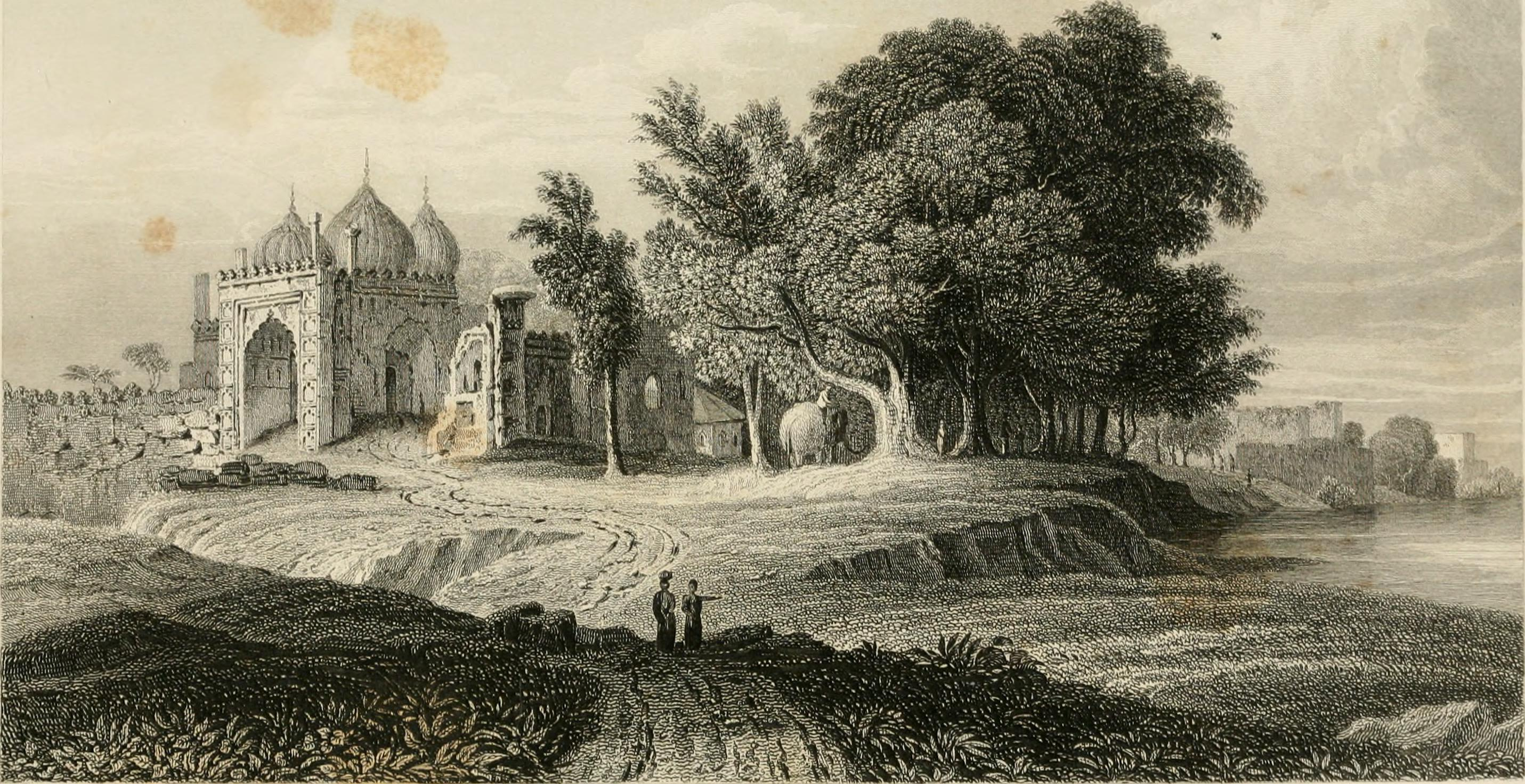
The same sketch engraved by W. Taylor from a drawing by William Purser

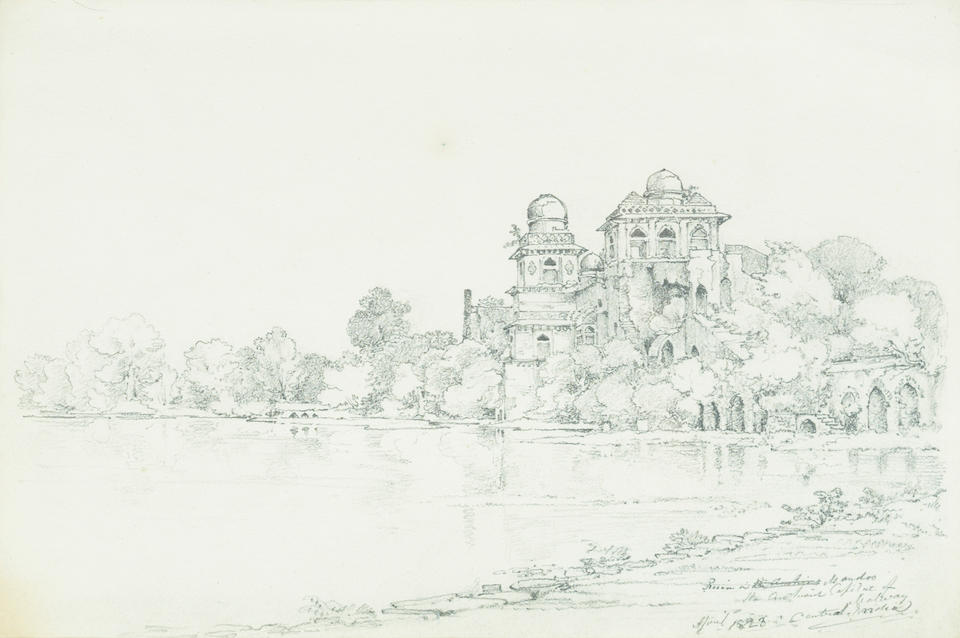
An Elliot sketch of Mandu, the Water Palace

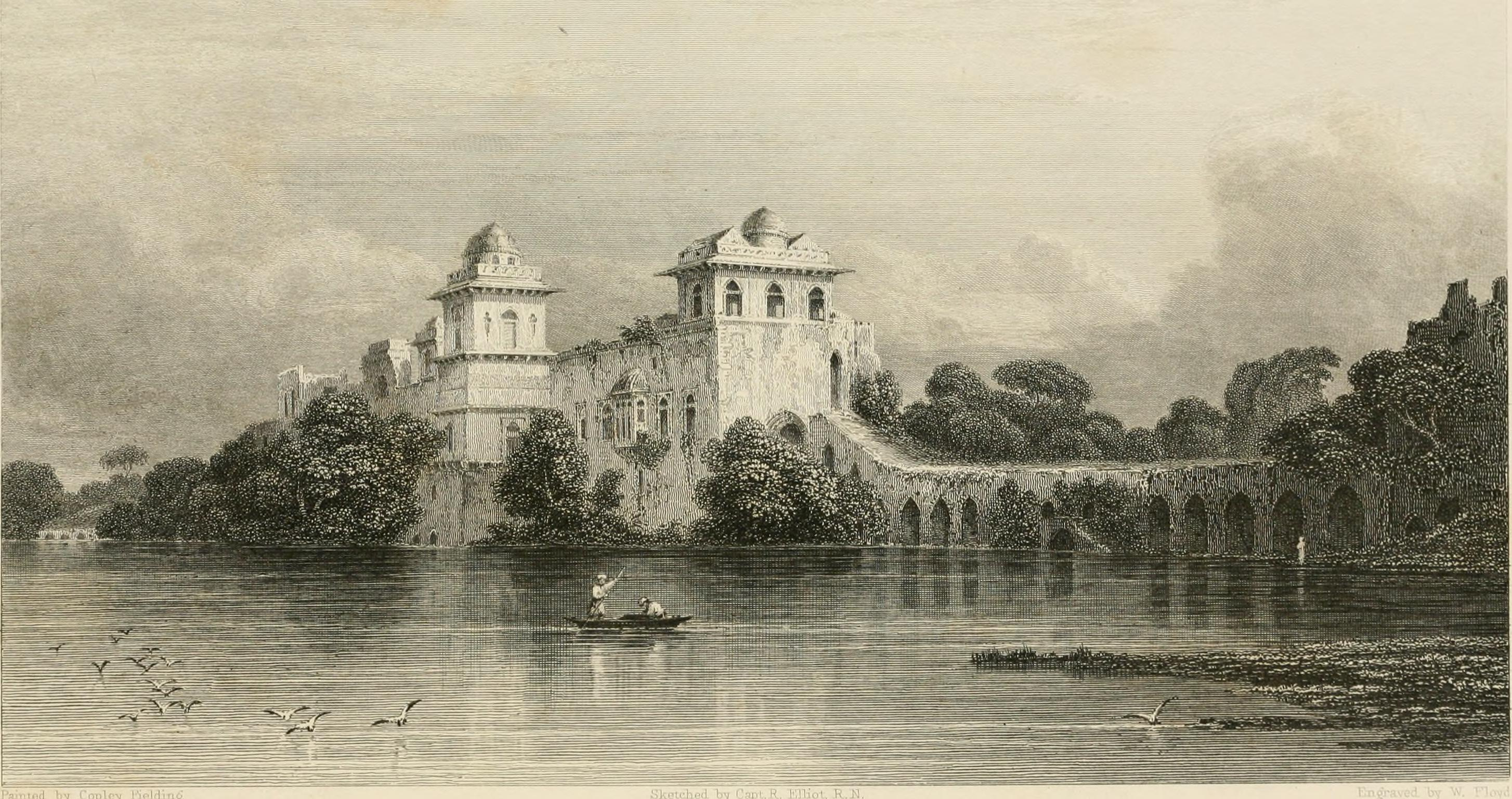
An engraving made from a similar sketch by W. Floyd, using a drawing by Anthony Fielding

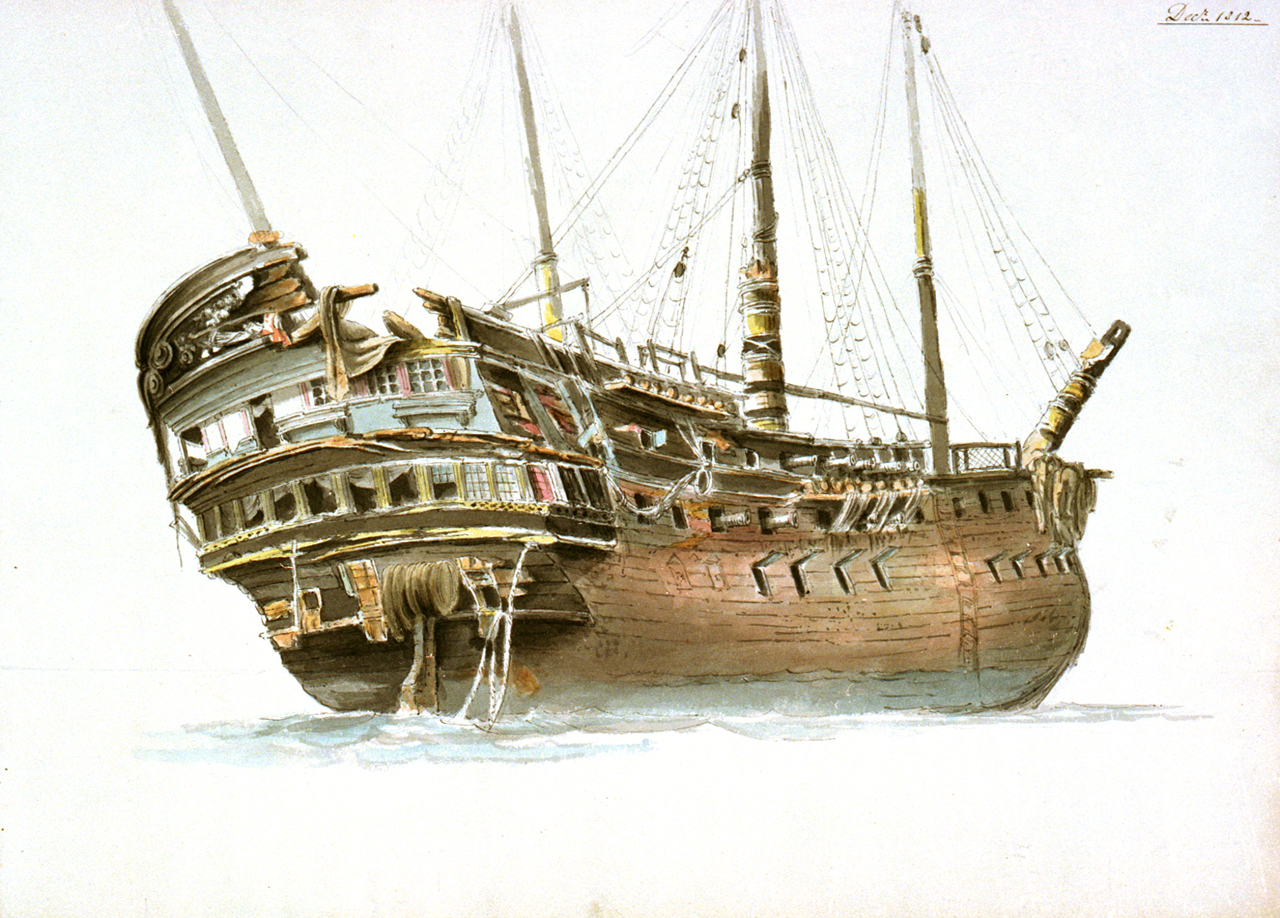
Starboard quarter of a derelict three-decker

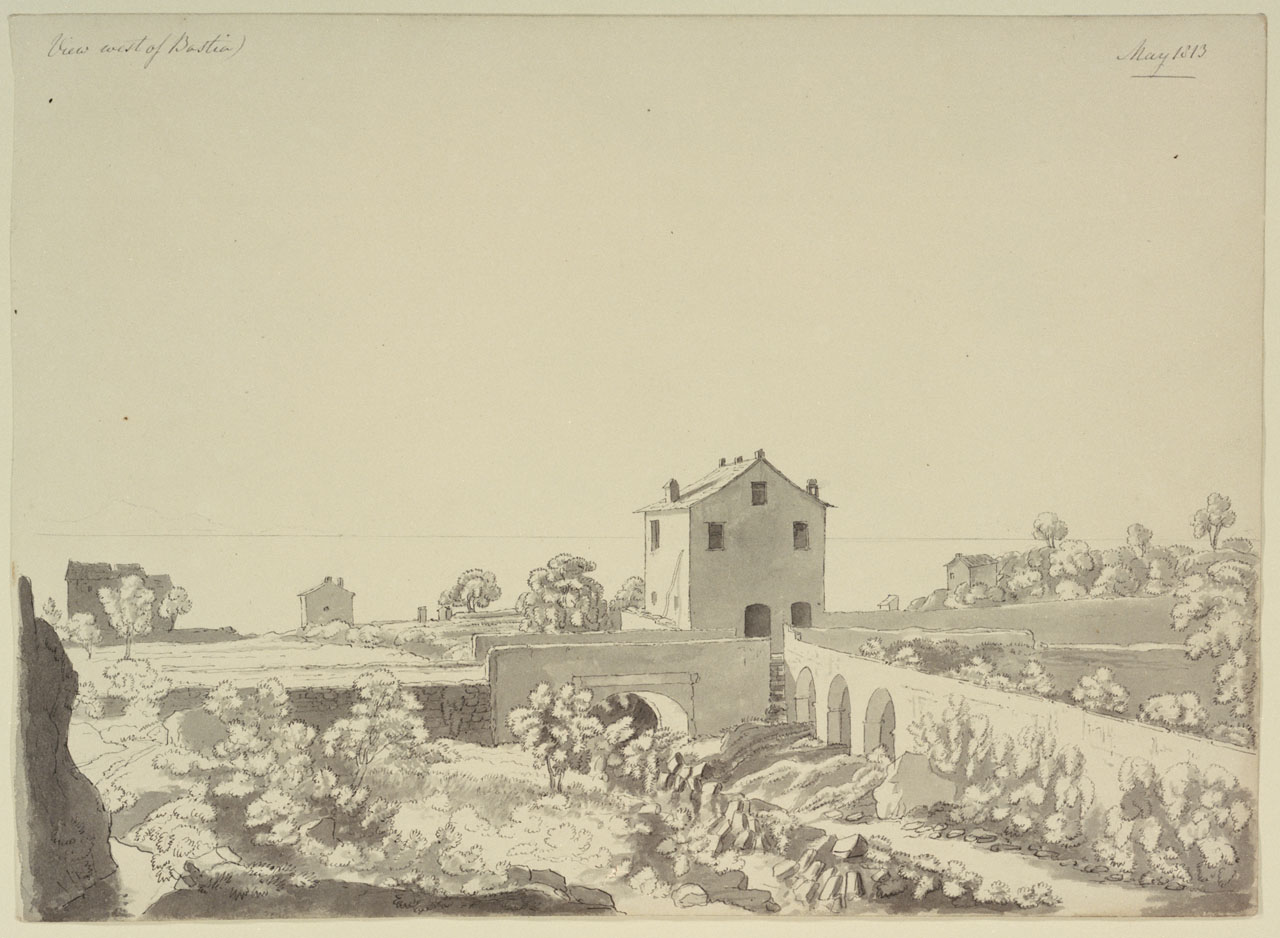
View west of Bastia May 1813

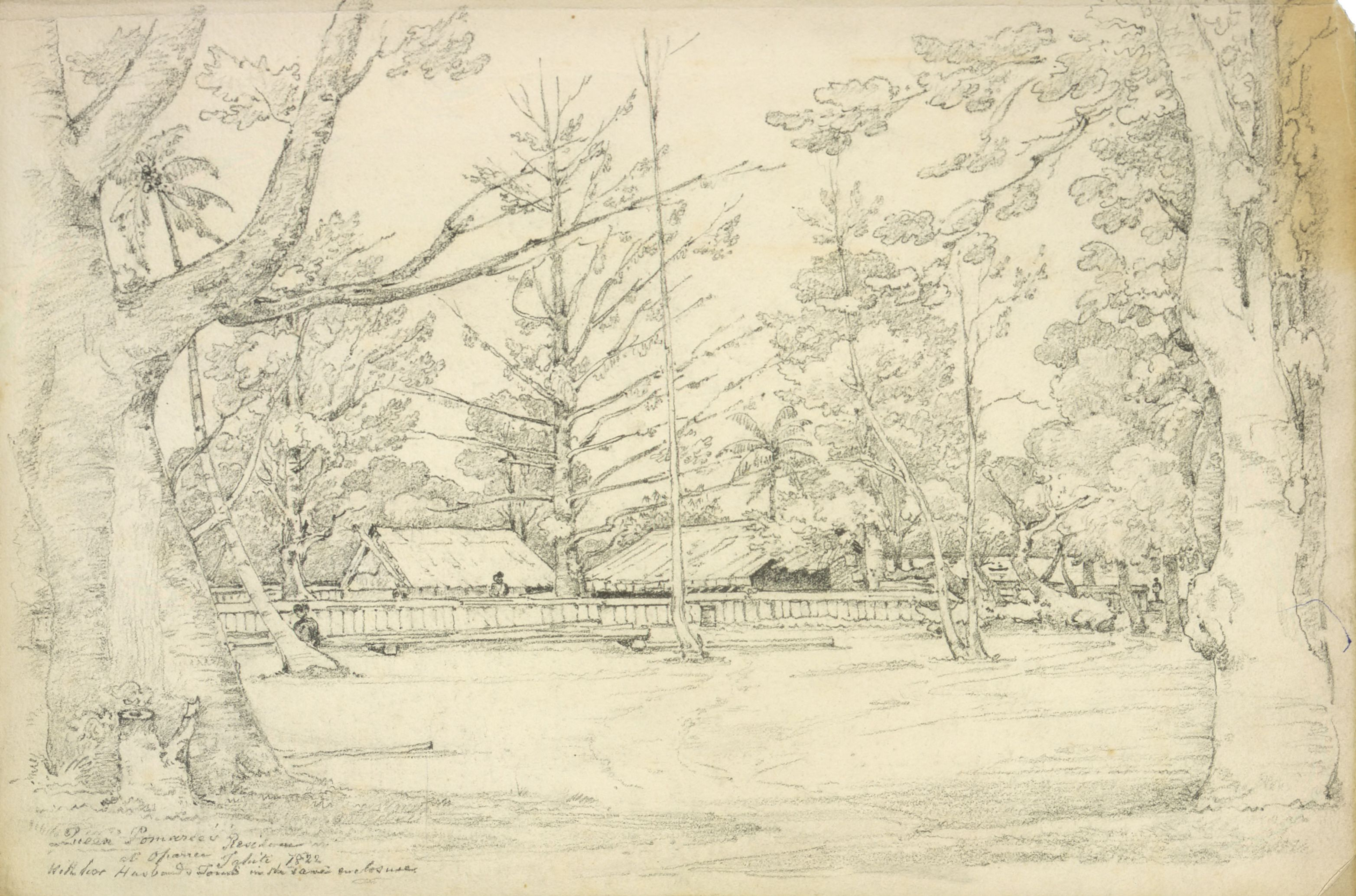
Queen Pomaree's residence at Oparrea, Tahiti, 1822

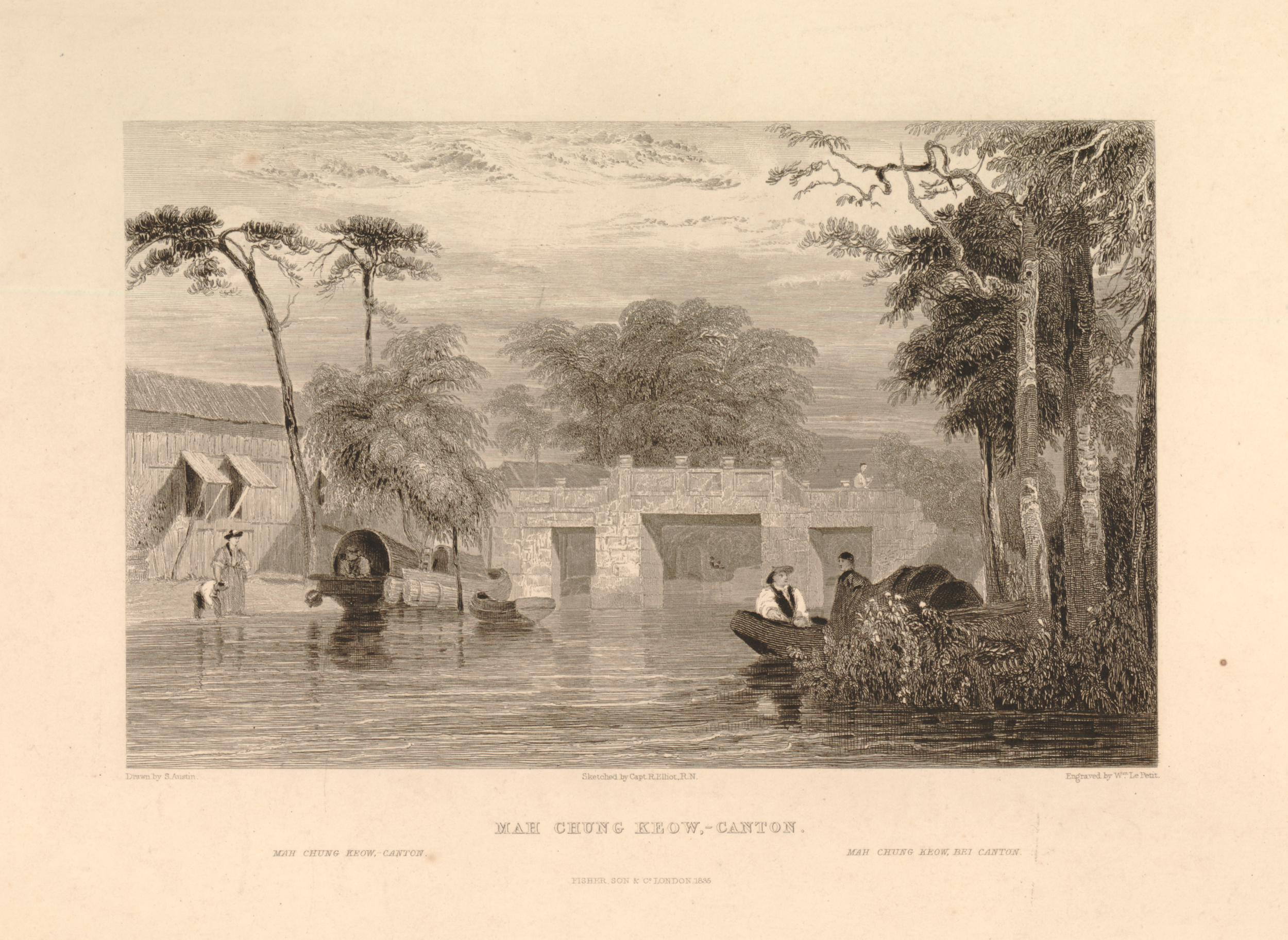
Bridge in Canton
