= Betawi =

Betawi may refer to:

- Betawi people
- Betawi language
- Betawi cuisine
- Betawi mask dance

== See also ==
- Bedawi (disambiguation)
- Batavi (disambiguation)
