= Batavia (cloth) =

Fashionable silk material in the 18th century

Batavia, also known as Batavia silk and Levantine, was initially a silk fabric used for dresses in 18th-century France.

In the 19th century, the material was made using greige silk in the warp and schappe silk in the weft. The fabric was also known as "Levantine". Imitations of it were made in cotton.

== Name ==
Batavia was named after the city where it was made Batavia (now Jakarta).

== Levantine ==
Levantine was a glazed cotton material woven with four harness twill weave. Initially, it was exported to Britain from the Levant.
