= Batavia, California =

Unincorporated community in California, United States

- Unincorporated community
- Location within California Location within the United States
- Coordinates: 38°24′23″N 121°51′35″W
- Country: United States
- State: California
- County: Solano
- Elevation: 62 ft (19 m)
- Time zone: UTC-8 (Pacific (PST))
  - Summer (DST): UTC-7 (PDT)
- Area code: 707
- GNIS feature ID: 1655814

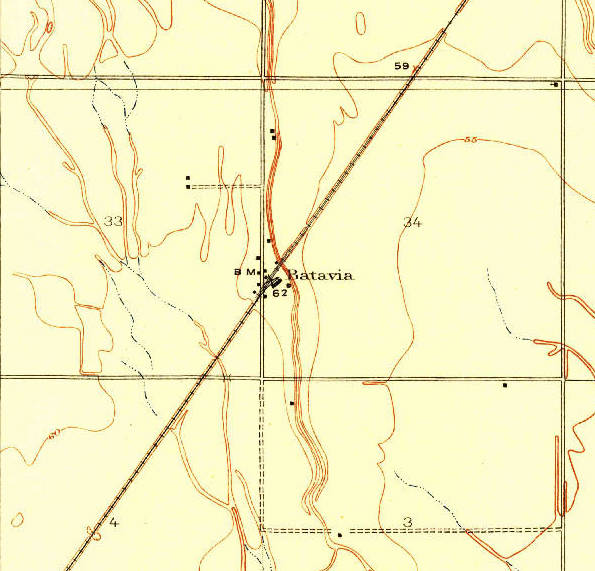
Batavia in 1916

Batavia is an unincorporated community in Solano County, California, United States. Batavia is situated along a railroad line, the Union Pacific Martinez Subdivision, approximately 3.5 miles (5.6 km) southwest of Dixon. It was a California Pacific Railroad station that was named, circa 1870, for the Latin name of The Netherlands. Today, various UP freight and Amtrak passenger trains speed through Batavia daily without stopping.

Batavia reportedly was platted in 1868 and had several streets laid out, but it primarily consisted of a train depot and a few residences. The warehouses were destroyed in a fire in 1917. Batavia declined after highway travel largely replaced rail travel.
