= Batavia Road =

Batavia Road is an anchorage, or roadstead, in the Pelsaert Group of the Houtman Abrolhos, off the coast of Western Australia. It is located at 28°58′S 113°58′E, on the eastern side of Pelsaert Island, near its southern end. It was discovered and named in April 1840 by John Clements Wickham, captain of HMS Beagle. Wickham's assistant John Lort Stokes later wrote:

"On the south west point of the island the beams of a large vessel were discovered, and as the crew of the Zeewyk, lost in 1728 [sic], reported having seen the wreck of a ship on this part, there is little doubt that the remains were those of the Batavia, Commodore Pelsart, lost in 1627. We in consequence named our temporary anchorage Batavia Road, and the whole group Pelsart Group."

In fact the Batavia was wrecked in the Wallabi Group, 60 kilometres (40 mi) to the north. The wreckage seen by the Beagle was either that of the Zeewyk, or the unidentified wreck seen by the Zeewyks crew. The name Batavia Road is thus a misnomer, as are a number of other places named by Stokes, including Pelsaert Island, the Pelsaert Group, and Wreck Point. Stokes' erroneous view was accepted without question for over fifty years, and it has been claimed that the confusion caused the discovery of the Batavia shipwreck to be set back by over a century.
