= Political party strength in New York (state) =

Politics in the US state of New York

As of 2022, the Democratic Party dominates the politics of New York.

This page contains party enrollment data as well as historical data on the party affiliations of certain New York elected officials.

== Party enrollment ==
New York party enrollment data as of February 20, 2025
Party	%	Total voters		Total
Party	%	Active	Inactive	Total
Democratic	47.90	5,896,984	403,434	6,300,418
Republican	22.63	2,845,295	131,446	2,976,741
Conservative	1.27	160,125	7,107	167,232
Working Families	0.44	55,804	2,989	58,793
Minor parties	2.72	336,758	21,480	358,238
Unaffiliated	25.03	3,108,039	184,092	3,292,131
Total	100%	12,403,005	750,548	13,153,553

== Party affiliations of elected officials ==
The following table indicates the historical party affiliations of the following elected officials in the U.S. state of New York:

- Governor
- Lieutenant Governor
- Secretary of State (before 1927)
- Attorney General
- State Comptroller
- Treasurer (before 1927)

The table also indicates the historical party composition in the:

- State Senate
- State Assembly
- New York delegation to the United States Senate
- New York delegation to the United States House of Representatives (also see New York's congressional districts)

For years in which a presidential election was held, the table indicates which party's nominees received the state's electoral votes.

== 1777–1926 ==
Year	Executive offices						State Legislature		United States Congress			Electoral votes
Year	Governor	Lieutenant Governor	Secretary of State	Attorney General	Comptroller	Treasurer	Senate	Assembly	Senator (Class I)	Senator (Class III)	House	Electoral votes
1777	George Clinton (Note: There was no codified start for terms when Clinton took office; the date was set at July 1 in 1787, starting presumably in 1789. Most sources state that early governors took office on April 1; however, more contemporary sources note the elections were held on April 1, with the oath of office being delivered on July 1.)	Pierre Van Cortlandt	None (Note: Office established in 1778.)	Egbert Benson	Comfort Sands (Note: As Auditor-General.)	Peter Van Brugh Livingston						
1778	George Clinton	Pierre Van Cortlandt	John Morin Scott (Note: Died in office.)	Egbert Benson	Comfort Sands	Gerard Bancker						
…	George Clinton	Pierre Van Cortlandt	John Morin Scott	Egbert Benson	Comfort Sands	Gerard Bancker						
1781	George Clinton	Pierre Van Cortlandt	John Morin Scott	Egbert Benson	Comfort Sands	Gerard Bancker						
1782	George Clinton	Pierre Van Cortlandt	John Morin Scott	Egbert Benson	Peter T. Curtenius (Note: As Auditor.)	Gerard Bancker						
1783	George Clinton	Pierre Van Cortlandt	John Morin Scott	Egbert Benson	Peter T. Curtenius	Gerard Bancker						
1784	George Clinton	Pierre Van Cortlandt	Lewis Allaire Scott	Egbert Benson	Peter T. Curtenius	Gerard Bancker						
1785	George Clinton	Pierre Van Cortlandt	Lewis Allaire Scott	Egbert Benson	Peter T. Curtenius	Gerard Bancker						
1786	George Clinton	Pierre Van Cortlandt	Lewis Allaire Scott	Egbert Benson	Peter T. Curtenius	Gerard Bancker						
1787	George Clinton (AA)	Pierre Van Cortlandt (AA)	Lewis Allaire Scott	Egbert Benson	Peter T. Curtenius	Gerard Bancker						
1788	George Clinton (AA)	Pierre Van Cortlandt (AA)	Lewis Allaire Scott	Richard Varick (PA)	Peter T. Curtenius	Gerard Bancker						
1789	George Clinton (AA)	Pierre Van Cortlandt (AA)	Lewis Allaire Scott	Richard Varick (PA)	Peter T. Curtenius	Gerard Bancker	F majority	45DR, 19F, 1?	Philip Schuyler (PA)	Rufus King (PA)	3AA, 3PA	none (Note: Electors were to be appointed by state legislature, which deadlocked, so no electors were chosen.)
1790	George Clinton (AA)	Pierre Van Cortlandt (AA)	Lewis Allaire Scott	Aaron Burr (AA)	Peter T. Curtenius	Gerard Bancker	F majority	38F, 23DR, 4?	Philip Schuyler (PA)	Rufus King (PA)	3AA, 3PA	none
1791	George Clinton (AA)	Pierre Van Cortlandt (AA)	Lewis Allaire Scott	Aaron Burr (AA)	Peter T. Curtenius	Gerard Bancker	F majority	F majority	Aaron Burr (AA)	Rufus King (PA)	4PA, 2AA	none
1792	George Clinton (DR)	Pierre Van Cortlandt (DR)	Lewis Allaire Scott	Morgan Lewis (DR)	Peter T. Curtenius	Gerard Bancker	DR majority	DR majority	Aaron Burr (AA)	Rufus King (PA)	4PA, 2AA	Washington (I) ✓ / Clinton (DR) ✗ (Note: Electors, appointed by the state legislature, cast their ballots for these two candidates for president.)
1793	George Clinton (DR)	Pierre Van Cortlandt (DR)	Lewis Allaire Scott	Nathaniel Lawrence (DR)	Peter T. Curtenius	Gerard Bancker	DR majority	DR majority	Aaron Burr (AA)	Rufus King (PA)	7PA, 3AA	Washington (I) ✓ / Clinton (DR) ✗
1794	George Clinton (DR)	Pierre Van Cortlandt (DR)	Lewis Allaire Scott	Nathaniel Lawrence (DR)	Peter T. Curtenius	Gerard Bancker	F majority	F majority	Aaron Burr (AA)	Rufus King (PA)	7PA, 3AA	Washington (I) ✓ / Clinton (DR) ✗
1795	John Jay (F)	Stephen Van Rensselaer (F)	Lewis Allaire Scott	Nathaniel Lawrence (DR)	Peter T. Curtenius	Gerard Bancker	F majority	F majority	Aaron Burr (DR)	Rufus King (F)	5DR, 5F	Washington (I) ✓ / Clinton (DR) ✗
1796	John Jay (F)	Stephen Van Rensselaer (F)	Lewis Allaire Scott	Josiah Ogden Hoffman (F)	Peter T. Curtenius	Gerard Bancker	F majority	F majority	Aaron Burr (DR)	John Laurance (F)	5DR, 5F	Adams (F) ✓ / Pinckney (F) ✗
1797	John Jay (F)	Stephen Van Rensselaer (F)	Lewis Allaire Scott	Josiah Ogden Hoffman (F)	Samuel Jones	Gerard Bancker	35F, 7DR, 1 vac.	F majority	Philip Schuyler (F) (Note: Resigned due to ill health.)	John Laurance (F)	6F, 4DR	Adams (F) ✓ / Pinckney (F) ✗
1798	John Jay (F)	Stephen Van Rensselaer (F)	Daniel Hale (F)	Josiah Ogden Hoffman (F)	Samuel Jones	Robert McClellan (F)	36F, 5DR, 2 vac.	F majority	John Sloss Hobart (F) (Note: Appointed to United States district court.)	John Laurance (F)	6F, 4DR	Adams (F) ✓ / Pinckney (F) ✗
1798	John Jay (F)	Stephen Van Rensselaer (F)	Daniel Hale (F)	Josiah Ogden Hoffman (F)	Samuel Jones	Robert McClellan (F)	36F, 5DR, 2 vac.	F majority	William North (F) (Note: Appointed by the Governor to fill remainder of unexpired term.)	John Laurance (F)	6F, 4DR	Adams (F) ✓ / Pinckney (F) ✗
1799	John Jay (F)	Stephen Van Rensselaer (F)	Daniel Hale (F)	Josiah Ogden Hoffman (F)	Samuel Jones	Robert McClellan (F)	32F, 11DR	F majority	James Waston (F) (Note: Resigned to accept an appointment as a United States naval officer.)	John Laurance (F)	6DR, 4F	Adams (F) ✓ / Pinckney (F) ✗
1800	John Jay (F)	Stephen Van Rensselaer (F)	Daniel Hale (F)	Josiah Ogden Hoffman (F)	John Vernon Henry (F)	Robert McClellan (F)	32F, 11DR	F majority	Gouverneur Morris (F)	John Armstrong Jr. (DR) (Note: Resigned.)	6DR, 4F	Jefferson/ Burr (DR) ✓
1801	George Clinton (DR)	Jeremiah Van Rensselaer (DR)	Thomas Tillotson (DR)	Josiah Ogden Hoffman (F)	John Vernon Henry (F)	Robert McClellan (F)	22F, 21DR	83DR, 25F	Gouverneur Morris (F)	John Armstrong Jr. (DR)	7DR, 3F	Jefferson/ Burr (DR) ✓
1802	George Clinton (DR)	Jeremiah Van Rensselaer (DR)	Thomas Tillotson (DR)	Ambrose Spencer (DR)	Elisha Jenkins (DR) (Note: Resigned when appointed Secretary of State of New York.)	Robert McClellan (F)	22F, 21DR	83DR, 25F	Gouverneur Morris (F)	DeWitt Clinton (DR) (Note: Resigned to become Mayor of New York City.)	7DR, 3F	Jefferson/ Burr (DR) ✓
1803	George Clinton (DR)	Jeremiah Van Rensselaer (DR)	Thomas Tillotson (DR)	Ambrose Spencer (DR)	Elisha Jenkins (DR)	Abraham G. Lansing (L)	21DR, 1F	73DR, 32F, 3?	Theodorus Bailey (DR) (Note: Resigned to accept the position of Postmaster of New York City.)	DeWitt Clinton (DR)	12DR, 5F	Jefferson/ Burr (DR) ✓
1803	George Clinton (DR)	Jeremiah Van Rensselaer (DR)	Thomas Tillotson (DR)	Ambrose Spencer (DR)	Elisha Jenkins (DR)	Abraham G. Lansing (L)	21DR, 1F	73DR, 32F, 3?	Theodorus Bailey (DR)	John Armstrong Jr. (DR)	12DR, 5F	Jefferson/ Burr (DR) ✓
1804	Morgan Lewis (DR)	John Broome (DR)	Thomas Tillotson (DR)	John Woodworth (DR)	Elisha Jenkins (DR)	Abraham G. Lansing (L)	27DR, 5F	82DR, 18F	Theodorus Bailey (DR)	John Armstrong Jr. (DR)	12DR, 5F	Jefferson/ Clinton (DR) ✓ (Note: Electors appointed by state legislature.)
1804	Morgan Lewis (DR)	John Broome (DR)	Thomas Tillotson (DR)	John Woodworth (DR)	Elisha Jenkins (DR)	Abraham G. Lansing (L)	27DR, 5F	82DR, 18F	John Armstrong Jr. (DR) (Note: Resigned to become minister to France.)	John Smith (DR)	12DR, 5F	Jefferson/ Clinton (DR) ✓
1805	Morgan Lewis (DR)	John Broome (DR)	Thomas Tillotson (DR)	John Woodworth (DR)	Elisha Jenkins (DR)	Abraham G. Lansing (L)	28DR, 4F	77DR, 21F, 2B	Samuel L. Mitchill (DR)	John Smith (DR)	15DR, 2F	Jefferson/ Clinton (DR) ✓
1806	Morgan Lewis (DR)	John Broome (DR)	Elisha Jenkins (DR)	John Woodworth (DR)	Archibald McIntyre (DR)	Abraham G. Lansing (L)	32DR	76DR, 19F, 5L (Note: With the election of Morgan Lewis as Governor, the DRs began to divide into two factions, the Lewisites loyal to Lewis, and Clintonians loyal to DeWitt Clinton.)	Samuel L. Mitchill (DR)	John Smith (DR)	15DR, 2F	Jefferson/ Clinton (DR) ✓
1807	Daniel D. Tompkins (DR) (Note: Resigned to become Vice President of the United States.)	John Broome (DR)	Thomas Tillotson (DR)	John Woodworth (DR)	Archibald McIntyre (DR)	Abraham G. Lansing (L)	32DR	49DR, 19F, 32L (Note: A coalition of Lewisites and Federalists elected a Lewisite, Andrew McCord, as Speaker and organized the chamber.)	Samuel L. Mitchill (DR)	John Smith (DR)	15DR, 2F	Jefferson/ Clinton (DR) ✓
1808	Daniel D. Tompkins (DR)	John Broome (DR)	Elisha Jenkins (DR)	Matthias B. Hildreth (DR)	Archibald McIntyre (DR)	David Thomas (C)	24DR, 8F&L	65DR, 23F, 11L	Samuel L. Mitchill (DR)	John Smith (DR)	15DR, 2F	13 – Madison/ Clinton (DR) ✓ 3 – Clinton/ Madison (DR) ✗ 3 – Clinton/ Monroe (DR) ✗
1809	Daniel D. Tompkins (DR)	John Broome (DR)	Elisha Jenkins (DR)	Matthias B. Hildreth (DR)	Archibald McIntyre (DR)	David Thomas (C)	23DR, 9F	61DR, 48F, 3L, 1IR	Obadiah German (DR)	John Smith (DR)	10DR, 7F	13 – Madison/ Clinton (DR) ✓ 3 – Clinton/ Madison (DR) ✗ 3 – Clinton/ Monroe (DR) ✗
1810	Daniel D. Tompkins (DR)	John Broome (DR)	Daniel Hale (F)	Abraham Van Vechten (F)	Archibald McIntyre (DR)	Abraham G. Lansing (F)	20DR, 12F	64F, 48DR	Obadiah German (DR)	John Smith (DR)	10DR, 7F	13 – Madison/ Clinton (DR) ✓ 3 – Clinton/ Madison (DR) ✗ 3 – Clinton/ Monroe (DR) ✗
1811	Daniel D. Tompkins (DR)	John Tayler (DR) (Note: As Temporary President of the State Senate, became acting Lieutenant Governor upon a vacancy in the office.)	Daniel Hale (F)	Matthias B. Hildreth (DR)	Archibald McIntyre (DR)	Abraham G. Lansing (F)	22DR, 10F	71DR, 41F	Obadiah German (DR)	John Smith (DR)	12DR, 5F	13 – Madison/ Clinton (DR) ✓ 3 – Clinton/ Madison (DR) ✗ 3 – Clinton/ Monroe (DR) ✗
1811	Daniel D. Tompkins (DR)	DeWitt Clinton (DR)	Elisha Jenkins (DR)	Matthias B. Hildreth (DR)	Archibald McIntyre (DR)	Abraham G. Lansing (F)	22DR, 10F	71DR, 41F	Obadiah German (DR)	John Smith (DR)	12DR, 5F	13 – Madison/ Clinton (DR) ✓ 3 – Clinton/ Madison (DR) ✗ 3 – Clinton/ Monroe (DR) ✗
1812	Daniel D. Tompkins (DR)	DeWitt Clinton (DR)	Elisha Jenkins (DR)	Thomas Addis Emmet (DR)	Archibald McIntyre (DR)	David Thomas (DR)	25DR, 7F	69DR, 43F	Obadiah German (DR)	John Smith (DR)	12DR, 5F	D. Clinton/ Ingersoll (DR/F) ✗
1813	Daniel D. Tompkins (DR)	John Tayler (DR)	Jacob R. Van Rensselaer (F)	Abraham Van Vechten (F)	Archibald McIntyre (DR)	Charles Z. Platt (F)	24DR, 8F	59F, 52DR, 1 vac.	Obadiah German (DR)	Rufus King (F)	19F, 8DR	D. Clinton/ Ingersoll (DR/F) ✗
1814	Daniel D. Tompkins (DR)	John Tayler (DR)	Jacob R. Van Rensselaer (F)	Abraham Van Vechten (F)	Archibald McIntyre (DR)	Charles Z. Platt (F)	27DR, 5F	65F, 47DR	Obadiah German (DR)	Rufus King (F)	18F, 9DR	D. Clinton/ Ingersoll (DR/F) ✗
1815	Daniel D. Tompkins (DR)	John Tayler (DR)	Peter Buell Porter (DR)	Martin Van Buren (DR)	Archibald McIntyre (DR)	Charles Z. Platt (F)	26DR, 6F	71DR, 41F	Nathan Sanford (DR)	Rufus King (F)	21DR, 6F	D. Clinton/ Ingersoll (DR/F) ✗
1816	Daniel D. Tompkins (DR)	John Tayler (DR)	Robert L. Tillotson	Martin Van Buren (DR)	Archibald McIntyre (DR)	Charles Z. Platt (F)	25DR, 7F	63DR, 63F (Note: A Democratic-Republican, Daniel Cruger, was elected with three members absent on a 62–61 vote. A seat was contested by the Federalists, however, which led to an extended fight over the Council of Appointment. After the DRs won that debate, the contested seat was handed to the Federalist, and the Federalists had a functional majority of 62–61 despite the loss of the Speaker's seat.)	Nathan Sanford (DR)	Rufus King (F)	21DR, 6F	Monroe/ Tompkins (DR) ✓
1817	John Tayler (DR) (Note: As lieutenant governor, assumed governorship upon resignation of predecessor.)	Philetus Swift (DR)	Charles D. Cooper (DR)	Martin Van Buren (DR)	Archibald McIntyre (DR)	Gerrit L. Dox (DR)	25DR, 7F	90DR, 36F	Nathan Sanford (DR)	Rufus King (F)	22DR, 5F	Monroe/ Tompkins (DR) ✓
1817	DeWitt Clinton (DR) (Note: The length and dates of terms were changed in 1821, during Clinton's second term, which then ended on December 31, 1822 rather than July 1, 1823.)	John Tayler (DR)	Charles D. Cooper (DR)	Martin Van Buren (DR)	Archibald McIntyre (DR)	Gerrit L. Dox (DR)	25DR, 7F	90DR, 36F	Nathan Sanford (DR)	Rufus King (F)	22DR, 5F	Monroe/ Tompkins (DR) ✓
1818	DeWitt Clinton (DR)	John Tayler (DR)	John Van Ness Yates (DR)	Martin Van Buren (DR)	Archibald McIntyre (C)	Gerrit L. Dox (DR)	27DR, 5F	95DR, 31F	Nathan Sanford (DR)	Rufus King (F)	22DR, 5F	Monroe/ Tompkins (DR) ✓
1819	DeWitt Clinton (DR)	John Tayler (DR)	John Van Ness Yates (DR)	Thomas J. Oakley (F)	Archibald McIntyre (C)	Gerrit L. Dox (DR)	28DR, 4F	95DR, 30F, 1?	Nathan Sanford (DR)	vacant	21DR, 6F	Monroe/ Tompkins (DR) ✓
1820	DeWitt Clinton (DR)	John Tayler (DR)	John Van Ness Yates (DR)	Thomas J. Oakley (F)	Archibald McIntyre (C)	Gerrit L. Dox (DR)	18B, 13C, 1DR (Note: A division within the Democratic-Republican Party occurred with the election of DeWitt Clinton as Governor between the Clintonians, who were loyal to him, and Bucktails, who were aligned with Martin Van Buren.)	58B, 34F, 30C (Note: A coalition was formed between the Clintonians and Federalists to elect John Canfield Spencer, a Clintonian, as Speaker and organized the chamber.)	Nathan Sanford (DR)	Rufus King (F)	21DR, 6F	Monroe/ Tompkins (DR) ✓
1821	DeWitt Clinton (DR)	John Tayler (DR)	John Van Ness Yates (DR)	Samuel A. Talcott (DR)	John Savage (DR) (Note: Elected Chief Justice of the New York Supreme Court by the State Legislature.)	Benjamin Knower (B)	19B, 13C	71B, 33C, 22F	Martin Van Buren (DR/B)	Rufus King (F)	20DR, 7F	Monroe/ Tompkins (DR) ✓
1822	DeWitt Clinton (DR)	John Tayler (DR)	John Van Ness Yates (DR)	Samuel A. Talcott (DR)	John Savage (DR)	Benjamin Knower (B)	18C, 13B, 1?	73B, 48C, 5F	Martin Van Buren (DR/B)	Rufus King (F)	19DR, 8F	Monroe/ Tompkins (DR) ✓
1823	Joseph C. Yates (DR) (Note: Per the 1821 state constitution, Yates' term was the first to last two years rather than three.)	Erastus Root (DR)	John Van Ness Yates (DR)	Samuel A. Talcott (DR)	William L. Marcy (B) (Note: Elected a justice of the New York Supreme Court by the State Legislature shortly before the end of his second term.)	Benjamin Knower (B)	32B	112B, 16C	Martin Van Buren (DR/B)	Rufus King (F)	30DR, 4F	Monroe/ Tompkins (DR) ✓
1824	Joseph C. Yates (DR)	Erastus Root (DR)	John Van Ness Yates (DR)	Samuel A. Talcott (DR)	William L. Marcy (B)	Abraham Keyser Jr. (B)	30B, 2C	91B, 37C	Martin Van Buren (DR/B)	Rufus King (F)	30DR, 4F	26 – Adams/ Calhoun (DR) ✓ (Note: The state delegation of New York in the U.S. House of Representatives voted 18-14-2 for John Quincy Adams.); 5 – Crawford/ Macon (DR) ✗ 4 – Clay/ Sanford (DR) ✗ 1 – Jackson/ Calhoun (DR) ✗
1825	DeWitt Clinton (P) (Note: In April 1824, Clinton's political enemies, the Bucktails, voted in the New York State Legislature for his removal from his post as president of the Erie Canal Commission, causing such indignation among the electorate that he was nominated for governor by the "People's Party", and was re-elected governor over the official candidate of the Democratic-Republican Party, fellow canal commissioner Samuel Young.)	James Tallmadge Jr. (P)	John Van Ness Yates (DR)	Samuel A. Talcott (DR)	William L. Marcy (B)	Gamaliel H. Barstow (C)	21B, 11C	86C, 42B, 1I	Martin Van Buren (J) (Note: Resigned when elected Governor of New York.)	vacant	25NR, 9JD	26 – Adams/ Calhoun (DR) ✓ 5 – Crawford/ Macon (DR) ✗ 4 – Clay/ Sanford (DR) ✗ 1 – Jackson/ Calhoun (DR) ✗
1826	DeWitt Clinton (P)	James Tallmadge Jr. (P)	Azariah C. Flagg (DR)	Samuel A. Talcott (DR)	William L. Marcy (B)	Abraham Keyser Jr. (B)	17B, 15C	68B, 55C, 1I	Martin Van Buren (J)	Nathan Sanford (NR)	26NR, 8J	26 – Adams/ Calhoun (DR) ✓ 5 – Crawford/ Macon (DR) ✗ 4 – Clay/ Sanford (DR) ✗ 1 – Jackson/ Calhoun (DR) ✗
1827	DeWitt Clinton (P)	Nathaniel Pitcher (DR)	Azariah C. Flagg (DR)	Samuel A. Talcott (DR)	William L. Marcy (B)	Abraham Keyser Jr. (B)	17B, 15C	84B, 43C, 1I	Martin Van Buren (J)	Nathan Sanford (NR)	19J, 15NR	26 – Adams/ Calhoun (DR) ✓ 5 – Crawford/ Macon (DR) ✗ 4 – Clay/ Sanford (DR) ✗ 1 – Jackson/ Calhoun (DR) ✗
1828	DeWitt Clinton (P)	Nathaniel Pitcher (DR)	Azariah C. Flagg (DR)	Samuel A. Talcott (DR)	William L. Marcy (B)	Abraham Keyser Jr. (B)	22B, 10C	93J, 17A-M, 16NR	Martin Van Buren (J)	Nathan Sanford (NR)	18J, 16NR	Jackson/ Calhoun (D) ✓
1828	Nathaniel Pitcher (DR)	Peter R. Livingston (DR)	Azariah C. Flagg (DR)	Samuel A. Talcott (DR)	William L. Marcy (B)	Abraham Keyser Jr. (B)	22B, 10C	93J, 17A-M, 16NR	Martin Van Buren (J)	Nathan Sanford (NR)	18J, 16NR	Jackson/ Calhoun (D) ✓
1828	Nathaniel Pitcher (DR)	Charles Dayan (DR)	Azariah C. Flagg (DR)	Samuel A. Talcott (DR)	William L. Marcy (B)	Abraham Keyser Jr. (B)	22B, 10C	93J, 17A-M, 16NR	Martin Van Buren (J)	Nathan Sanford (NR)	18J, 16NR	Jackson/ Calhoun (D) ✓
1829	Martin Van Buren (J) (Note: Resigned to become United States Secretary of State.)	Enos T. Throop (J)	Azariah C. Flagg (J)	Samuel A. Talcott (DR)	Silas Wright (J) (Note: Resigned when elected to the United States Senate.)	Abraham Keyser Jr. (J)	20J, 9NR, 3A-M	82J, 30A-M, 16NR	Charles E. Dudley (J)	Nathan Sanford (NR)	19J, 12NR, 3A-M	Jackson/ Calhoun (D) ✓
1829	Enos T. Throop (J) (Note: As lieutenant governor, became governor for unexpired term and was later elected in his own right.)	Charles Stebbins (J)	Azariah C. Flagg (J)	Greene C. Bronson (D-B) (Note: Resigned to take seat on New York Supreme Court.)	Silas Wright (J)	Abraham Keyser Jr. (J)	20J, 9NR, 3A-M	82J, 30A-M, 16NR	Charles E. Dudley (J)	Nathan Sanford (NR)	19J, 12NR, 3A-M	Jackson/ Calhoun (D) ✓
1830	Enos T. Throop (J)	William M. Oliver (J)	Azariah C. Flagg (J)	Greene C. Bronson (D-B)	Silas Wright (J)	Abraham Keyser Jr. (J)	25J, 4NR, 3A-M	91J, 29A-M, 7NR	Charles E. Dudley (J)	Nathan Sanford (NR)	19J, 12NR, 3A-M	Jackson/ Calhoun (D) ✓
1831	Enos T. Throop (J)	Edward Philip Livingston (J)	Azariah C. Flagg (J)	Greene C. Bronson (D-B)	Silas Wright (J)	Abraham Keyser Jr. (J)	25J, 5A-M, 2NR	93J, 31A-M, 4NR	Charles E. Dudley (J)	William L. Marcy (J)	23J, 8A-M, 3NR	Jackson/ Calhoun (D) ✓
1832	Enos T. Throop (J)	Edward Philip Livingston (J)	Azariah C. Flagg (J)	Greene C. Bronson (D-B)	Silas Wright (J)	Abraham Keyser Jr. (J)	24J, 6A-M, 2NR	95J, 28A-M, 5NR	Charles E. Dudley (J)	William L. Marcy (J)	23J, 8A-M, 3NR	Jackson/ Van Buren (D) ✓
1833	William L. Marcy (D-H)	John Tracy (D)	John Adams Dix (D-B)	Greene C. Bronson (D-B)	Azariah C. Flagg (D-B)	Abraham Keyser Jr. (J)	26J, 6A-M	100J, 25A-M, 3NR	Nathaniel P. Tallmadge (J)	Silas Wright (J)	32J, 8A-M	Jackson/ Van Buren (D) ✓
1834	William L. Marcy (D-H)	John Tracy (D)	John Adams Dix (D-B)	Greene C. Bronson (D-B)	Azariah C. Flagg (D-B)	Abraham Keyser Jr. (J)	25J, 7A-M	113J, 10A-M, 5ID	Nathaniel P. Tallmadge (J)	Silas Wright (J)	32J, 8A-M	Jackson/ Van Buren (D) ✓
1835	William L. Marcy (D-H)	John Tracy (D)	John Adams Dix (D-B)	Greene C. Bronson (D-B)	Azariah C. Flagg (D-B)	Abraham Keyser Jr. (J)	28D, 4W	91D, 36W, 1 vac.	Nathaniel P. Tallmadge (J)	Silas Wright (J)	31J, 9NR	Jackson/ Van Buren (D) ✓
1836	William L. Marcy (D-H)	John Tracy (D)	John Adams Dix (D-B)	Samuel Beardsley (D-H)	Azariah C. Flagg (D-B)	Abraham Keyser Jr. (J)	28D, 4W	111D, 16W, 1A	Nathaniel P. Tallmadge (J)	Silas Wright (J)	32J, 8NR, 1W	Van Buren/ Johnson (D) ✓
1837	William L. Marcy (D-H)	John Tracy (D)	John Adams Dix (D-B)	Samuel Beardsley (D-H)	Azariah C. Flagg (D-B)	Abraham Keyser Jr. (D)	27D, 5W	90D, 38W	Nathaniel P. Tallmadge (D)	Silas Wright (D-B)	30D, 10W	Van Buren/ Johnson (D) ✓
1838	William L. Marcy (D-H)	John Tracy (D)	John Adams Dix (D-B)	Samuel Beardsley (D-H)	Azariah C. Flagg (D-B)	Gamaliel H. Barstow (W)	22D, 10W	100W, 28D	Nathaniel P. Tallmadge (D)	Silas Wright (D-B)	30D, 10W	Van Buren/ Johnson (D) ✓
1839	William H. Seward (W)	Luther Bradish (W)	John Canfield Spencer (W) (Note: Resigned to become United States Secretary of War.)	Willis Hall (W)	Bates Cooke (W)	Jacob Haight (W)	18D, 14W	83W, 45D	vacant	Silas Wright (D-B)	21W, 19D	Van Buren/ Johnson (D) ✓
1840	William H. Seward (W)	Luther Bradish (W)	John Canfield Spencer (W)	Willis Hall (W)	Bates Cooke (W)	Jacob Haight (W)	20W, 12D	70W, 58D	Nathaniel P. Tallmadge (W) (Note: Resigned when appointed Governor of Wisconsin Territory.)	Silas Wright (D-B)	21W, 19D	Harrison/ Tyler (W) ✓
1841	William H. Seward (W)	Luther Bradish (W)	Archibald Campbell (NP)	Willis Hall (W)	John A. Collier (W)	Jacob Haight (W)	21W, 11D	66W, 62D	Nathaniel P. Tallmadge (W)	Silas Wright (D-B)	21D, 19W	Harrison/ Tyler (W) ✓
1842	William H. Seward (W)	Luther Bradish (W)	Samuel Young (D-B)	George P. Barker (D)	Azariah C. Flagg (D-B)	Thomas Farrington (D-B)	17D, 15W	96D, 32W	Nathaniel P. Tallmadge (W)	Silas Wright (D-B)	21D, 19W	Harrison/ Tyler (W) ✓
1843	William C. Bouck (D-H)	Daniel S. Dickinson (D-H)	Samuel Young (D-B)	George P. Barker (D)	Azariah C. Flagg (D-B)	Thomas Farrington (D-B)	22D, 10W	92D, 36W	Nathaniel P. Tallmadge (W)	Silas Wright (D-B)	24D, 10W	Harrison/ Tyler (W) ✓
1844	William C. Bouck (D-H)	Daniel S. Dickinson (D-H)	Samuel Young (D-B)	George P. Barker (D)	Azariah C. Flagg (D-B)	Thomas Farrington (D-B)	26D, 6W	92D, 36W	Nathaniel P. Tallmadge (W)	Silas Wright (D-B)	24D, 10W	Polk/ Dallas (D) ✓
1844	William C. Bouck (D-H)	Daniel S. Dickinson (D-H)	Samuel Young (D-B)	George P. Barker (D)	Azariah C. Flagg (D-B)	Thomas Farrington (D-B)	26D, 6W	92D, 36W	vacant	Henry A. Foster (D)	24D, 10W	Polk/ Dallas (D) ✓
1845	Silas Wright (D-B)	Addison Gardiner (D)	Nathaniel S. Benton (D-H) (Note: Legislated out of office by State Constitution of 1846.)	John Van Buren (D-B)	Azariah C. Flagg (D-B)	Benjamin Enos (D-H)	27D, 4W, 1KN	65D, 47W, 15KN, 1ID	Daniel S. Dickinson (D-H)	John Adams Dix (D-B)	21D, 9W, 4KN	Polk/ Dallas (D) ✓
1846	Silas Wright (D-B)	Addison Gardiner (D)	Nathaniel S. Benton (D-H)	John Van Buren (D-B)	Azariah C. Flagg (D-B)	Thomas Farrington (D-B)	25D, 6W, 1KN	74D, 51W, 2AR, 1ID	Daniel S. Dickinson (D-H)	John Adams Dix (D-B)	21D, 9W, 4KN	Polk/ Dallas (D) ✓
1847	John Young (W)	Addison Gardiner (D)	Nathaniel S. Benton (D-H)	John Van Buren (D-B)	Azariah C. Flagg (D-B)	Thomas Farrington (D-B)	21D, 10W, 1KN	76W, 52D	Daniel S. Dickinson (D-H)	John Adams Dix (D-B)	23W, 11D	Polk/ Dallas (D) ✓
1848	John Young (W)	Hamilton Fish (W)	Christopher Morgan (W) (Note: First popularly-elected Secretary of State.)	Ambrose L. Jordan (W/AR) (Note: First popularly-elected Attorney General.)	Millard Fillmore (W) (Note: First popularly-elected Comptroller.)	Alvah Hunt (W) (Note: First popularly-elected Treasurer.)	24W, 8D (Note: With the adoption of the Constitution of 1847, Senators moved from having one-quarter of the body each year to having every seat in the body up every two years, starting with the election of 1847.)	91W, 36D, 1I	Daniel S. Dickinson (D-H)	John Adams Dix (D-B)	24W, 10D	Taylor/ Fillmore (W) ✓
1849	Hamilton Fish (W)	George W. Patterson (W)	Christopher Morgan (W)	Ambrose L. Jordan (W/AR)	Millard Fillmore (W)	Alvah Hunt (W)	24W, 8D	106W, 14FS, 7D, 1AR	Daniel S. Dickinson (D-H)	William H. Seward (W)	32W, 1D, 1FS	Taylor/ Fillmore (W) ✓
1850	Hamilton Fish (W)	George W. Patterson (W)	Christopher Morgan (W)	Levi S. Chatfield (D)	Washington Hunt (W)	Alvah Hunt (W)	17W, 15D	64D, 64W (Note: Due to a disputed election with a Whig candidate, the Democrats had a nominal majority at the start of session, and elected Noble S. Elderkin Speaker and organized the chamber. Midway through the session, Elderkin departed to care for his ill wife, and the Whigs assumed functional control under Robert H. Pruyn. After the seat dispute was decided in favor of the Democrat, and after it had been determined Elderkin would be gone the rest of session, a Democrat, Ferral C. Dininny, was again selected as Speaker.)	Daniel S. Dickinson (D-H)	William H. Seward (W)	32W, 1D, 1FS	Taylor/ Fillmore (W) ✓
1851	Washington Hunt (W)	Sanford E. Church (D)	Christopher Morgan (W)	Levi S. Chatfield (D)	Philo C. Fuller (W)	Alvah Hunt (W)	17W, 15D	82W, 44D, 1FS, 1I	vacant	William H. Seward (W)	17W, 16D, 1FS	Taylor/ Fillmore (W) ✓
1852	Washington Hunt (W)	Sanford E. Church (D)	Henry S. Randall (D)	Levi S. Chatfield (D)	John C. Wright (D)	James M. Cook (W)	16W, 16D (Note: As a results of the even split, over the two year term, the Senate President Pro Tempore was traded between Edwin D. Morgan, a Whig, and William McMurray, a Democrat. Morgan had it for the first two months of 1852, then McMurray had it the last month of that session and the regular session of 1853, and then Morgan retained for the special session of 1853.)	65W, 63D	Hamilton Fish (W)	William H. Seward (W)	17W, 16D, 1FS	Pierce/ King (D) ✓
1853	Horatio Seymour (D)	Sanford E. Church (D)	Henry S. Randall (D)	Levi S. Chatfield (D)	John C. Wright (D)	Benjamin Welch (D) (Note: Welch successfully contested Cook's election, and served from November 20, 1852 to the end of the term.)	16W, 16D	88D, 40W	Hamilton Fish (W)	William H. Seward (W)	20D 11W, 1FS, 1I	Pierce/ King (D) ✓
1853	Horatio Seymour (D)	Sanford E. Church (D)	Henry S. Randall (D)	Gardner Stow (W)	John C. Wright (D)	Benjamin Welch (D)	16W, 16D	88D, 40W	Hamilton Fish (W)	William H. Seward (W)	20D 11W, 1FS, 1I	Pierce/ King (D) ✓
1854	Horatio Seymour (D)	Sanford E. Church (D)	Elias W. Leavenworth (W)	Ogden Hoffman (W)	James M. Cook (W)	Elbridge G. Spaulding (W)	24W, 8D	77W, 47D, 2I, 1FS, 1AML	Hamilton Fish (W)	William H. Seward (W)	19D, 12W, 1I	Pierce/ King (D) ✓
1855	Myron H. Clark (W) (Note: Elected on a fusion Whig-Free Democratic ticket.)	Henry Jarvis Raymond (W)	Elias W. Leavenworth (W)	Ogden Hoffman (W)	James M. Cook (W)	Elbridge G. Spaulding (W)	24W, 8D	75W, 38D, 9KN, 4T, 2R	Hamilton Fish (W)	William H. Seward (R)	23O, 5D, 3KN, 2W	Pierce/ King (D) ✓
1856	Myron H. Clark (W)	Henry Jarvis Raymond (W)	Joel T. Headley (KN)	Stephen B. Cushing (KN)	Lorenzo Burrows (KN)	Stephen Clark (KN)	16R, 12KN, 4D (Note: The Republicans organized the chamber.)	47D, 44KN, 35R, 2W (Note: A Democrat, Orville Robinson, was elected with the help of Republican members on the 49th ballot.)	Hamilton Fish (W)	William H. Seward (R)	23O, 5D, 3KN, 2W	Frémont/ Dayton (R) ✗
1857	John A. King (R)	Henry R. Selden (R)	Joel T. Headley (KN)	Stephen B. Cushing (KN)	Lorenzo Burrows (KN)	Stephen Clark (KN)	16R, 12KN, 4D	80R, 40D, 8KN	Preston King (R)	William H. Seward (R)	21R, 12D	Frémont/ Dayton (R) ✗
1858	John A. King (R)	Henry R. Selden (R)	Gideon J. Tucker (D)	Lyman Tremain (D)	Sanford E. Church (D)	Isaac V. Vanderpoel (D)	15R, 14D, 2KN, 1IR (Note: The Know Nothings and Independent Republican members worked with the Republicans to organize the chamber.)	61R, 57D, 11KN (Note: A Democrat, Thomas G. Alvord, was elected with the help of the Know Nothings on the 53th ballot.)	Preston King (R)	William H. Seward (R)	21R, 12D	Frémont/ Dayton (R) ✗
1859	Edwin D. Morgan (R)	Robert Campbell (R)	Gideon J. Tucker (D)	Lyman Tremain (D)	Sanford E. Church (D)	Isaac V. Vanderpoel (D)	15R, 14D, 2KN, 1IR	91R, 27D, 9KN, 1ID	Preston King (R)	William H. Seward (R)	26R, 7D	Frémont/ Dayton (R) ✗
1860	Edwin D. Morgan (R)	Robert Campbell (R)	David R. Floyd-Jones (D)	Charles G. Myers (R)	Robert Denniston (R)	Philip Dorsheimer (R)	23R, 9D	90R, 37D, 1 vac.	Preston King (R)	William H. Seward (R)	26R, 7D	Lincoln/ Hamlin (R) ✓
1861	Edwin D. Morgan (R)	Robert Campbell (R)	David R. Floyd-Jones (D)	Charles G. Myers (R)	Robert Denniston (R)	Philip Dorsheimer (R)	23R, 9D	93R, 35D	Preston King (R)	Ira Harris (R)	23R, 10D	Lincoln/ Hamlin (R) ✓
1862	Edwin D. Morgan (R)	Robert Campbell (R)	Horatio Ballard (NU)	Daniel S. Dickinson (NU)	Lucius Robinson (NU)	William Lewis (NU)	24R, 8D	92R, 35D, 1IR	Preston King (R)	Ira Harris (R)	23R, 10D	Lincoln/ Hamlin (R) ✓
1863	Horatio Seymour (CU)	David R. Floyd-Jones (CU)	Horatio Ballard (NU)	Daniel S. Dickinson (NU)	Lucius Robinson (NU)	William Lewis (NU)	24R, 8D	64D, 64R (Note: A Democrat, Theophilus C. Callicot, was elected Speaker after cutting a deal with the Republicans that if he was elected, he would guarantee the election of a Republican Senator, later determined to be Edwin D. Morgan.)	Edwin D. Morgan (R)	Ira Harris (R)	17D, 13R, 1U	Lincoln/ Hamlin (R) ✓
1864	Horatio Seymour (CU)	David R. Floyd-Jones (CU)	Chauncey Depew (NU)	John Cochrane (NU)	Lucius Robinson (NU)	George W. Schuyler (NU)	21R, 11D	81R, 45D, 1ID, 1U	Edwin D. Morgan (R)	Ira Harris (R)	17D, 13R, 1U	Lincoln/ Johnson (NU) ✓
1865	Reuben Fenton (NU)	Thomas G. Alvord (NU)	Chauncey Depew (NU)	John Cochrane (NU)	Lucius Robinson (NU)	George W. Schuyler (NU)	21R, 11D	75R, 52D, 1ID	Edwin D. Morgan (R)	Ira Harris (R)	21R, 10D	Lincoln/ Johnson (NU) ✓
1866	Reuben Fenton (NU)	Thomas G. Alvord (NU)	Francis C. Barlow (R)	John H. Martindale (R)	Thomas Hillhouse (R)	Joseph Howland (R)	27R, 5D	90R, 38D	Edwin D. Morgan (R)	Ira Harris (R)	21R, 10D	Lincoln/ Johnson (NU) ✓
1867	Reuben Fenton (R)	Stewart L. Woodford (R)	Francis C. Barlow (R)	John H. Martindale (R)	Thomas Hillhouse (R)	Joseph Howland (R)	27R, 5D	83R, 45D	Edwin D. Morgan (R)	Roscoe Conkling (R) (Note: Resigned in protest of President James A. Garfield's position on federal appointments.)	21R, 10D	Lincoln/ Johnson (NU) ✓
1868	Reuben Fenton (R)	Stewart L. Woodford (R)	Homer Augustus Nelson (D)	Marshall B. Champlain (D)	William F. Allen (D) (Note: Resigned to become a judge of the New York Court of Appeals.)	Wheeler H. Bristol (D)	17R, 15D	73D, 55R	Edwin D. Morgan (R)	Roscoe Conkling (R)	21R, 10D	Seymour/ Blair (D) ✗
1869	John T. Hoffman (D)	Allen C. Beach (D)	Homer Augustus Nelson (D)	Marshall B. Champlain (D)	William F. Allen (D)	Wheeler H. Bristol (D)	17R, 15D	74R, 52D, 2ID	Reuben Fenton (R)	Roscoe Conkling (R)	18R, 13D	Seymour/ Blair (D) ✗
1870	John T. Hoffman (D)	Allen C. Beach (D)	Homer Augustus Nelson (D)	Marshall B. Champlain (D)	Asher P. Nichols (D)	Wheeler H. Bristol (D)	18D, 14R	73D, 55R	Reuben Fenton (R)	Roscoe Conkling (R)	18R, 13D	Seymour/ Blair (D) ✗
1871	John T. Hoffman (D)	Allen C. Beach (D)	Homer Augustus Nelson (D)	Marshall B. Champlain (D)	Asher P. Nichols (D)	Wheeler H. Bristol (D)	18D, 14R	65D, 63R	Reuben Fenton (R)	Roscoe Conkling (R)	16D, 15R	Seymour/ Blair (D) ✗
1872	John T. Hoffman (D)	Allen C. Beach (D)	G. Hilton Scribner (R)	Francis C. Barlow (R)	Nelson K. Hopkins (R)	Thomas Raines (R)	25R, 7D	97R, 31D	Reuben Fenton (R)	Roscoe Conkling (R)	16D, 15R	Grant/ Wilson (R) ✓
1873	John Adams Dix (R)	John C. Robinson (R)	G. Hilton Scribner (R)	Francis C. Barlow (R)	Nelson K. Hopkins (R)	Thomas Raines (R)	25R, 7D	92R, 34D, 2LR	Reuben Fenton (R)	Roscoe Conkling (R)	24R, 9D	Grant/ Wilson (R) ✓
1874	John Adams Dix (R)	John C. Robinson (R)	Diedrich Willers Jr. (D)	Daniel Pratt (D)	Nelson K. Hopkins (R)	Abraham Lansing (D)	18R, 13D, 1IR	72R, 54D, 2LR	Reuben Fenton (R)	Roscoe Conkling (R)	23R, 10D	Grant/ Wilson (R) ✓
1875	Samuel J. Tilden (D)	William Dorsheimer (D)	Diedrich Willers Jr. (D)	Daniel Pratt (D)	Nelson K. Hopkins (R)	Thomas Raines (D)	18R, 13D, 1IR	74D, 53R, 1ID	Francis Kernan (D)	Roscoe Conkling (R)	17R, 16D	Grant/ Wilson (R) ✓
1876	Samuel J. Tilden (D)	William Dorsheimer (D)	John Bigelow (D)	Charles S. Fairchild (D)	Lucius Robinson (D)	Charles N. Ross (D)	20R, 12D	71R, 57D	Francis Kernan (D)	Roscoe Conkling (R)	17R, 16D	Tilden/ Hendricks (D) ✗
1877	Lucius Robinson (D) (Note: Per an 1874 amendment to the state constitution—taking effect January 1, 1875—Robinson's term was the first to last three years instead of two. As Tilden had been elected prior to the amendment's taking effect, he served the old two-year term.)	William Dorsheimer (D)	John Bigelow (D)	Charles S. Fairchild (D)	Frederic P. Olcott (D)	Charles N. Ross (D)	20R, 12D	70R, 58D	Francis Kernan (D)	Roscoe Conkling (R)	17R, 16D	Tilden/ Hendricks (D) ✗
1878	Lucius Robinson (D)	William Dorsheimer (D)	Allen C. Beach (D)	Augustus Schoonmaker Jr. (D)	Frederic P. Olcott (D)	James Mackin (D)	19R, 12D, 1ID	66R, 61D, 1GB	Francis Kernan (D)	Roscoe Conkling (R)	17R, 16D	Tilden/ Hendricks (D) ✗
1879	Lucius Robinson (D)	William Dorsheimer (D)	Allen C. Beach (D)	Augustus Schoonmaker Jr. (D)	Frederic P. Olcott (D)	James Mackin (D)	19R, 12D, 1ID	98R, 27D, 3GB	Francis Kernan (D)	Roscoe Conkling (R)	24R, 9D	Tilden/ Hendricks (D) ✗
1880	Alonzo B. Cornell (R)	George Gilbert Hoskins (R)	Joseph Bradford Carr (R)	Hamilton Ward Sr. (R)	James W. Wadsworth (R)	Nathan D. Wendell (R)	25R, 7D	91R, 35D, 1GB, 1ID	Francis Kernan (D)	Roscoe Conkling (R)	24R, 9D	Garfield/ Arthur (R) ✓
1881	Alonzo B. Cornell (R)	George Gilbert Hoskins (R)	Joseph Bradford Carr (R)	Hamilton Ward Sr. (R)	James W. Wadsworth (R)	Nathan D. Wendell (R)	25R, 7D	80R, 47D, 1ID	Thomas C. Platt (R)	Roscoe Conkling (R)	19R, 13D, 1I	Garfield/ Arthur (R) ✓
1881	Alonzo B. Cornell (R)	George Gilbert Hoskins (R)	Joseph Bradford Carr (R)	Hamilton Ward Sr. (R)	James W. Wadsworth (R)	Nathan D. Wendell (R)	25R, 7D	80R, 47D, 1ID	Warner Miller (R)	Elbridge G. Lapham (R)	19R, 13D, 1I	Garfield/ Arthur (R) ✓
1882	Alonzo B. Cornell (R)	George Gilbert Hoskins (R)	Joseph Bradford Carr (R)	Leslie W. Russell (R)	Ira Davenport (R)	Robert A. Maxwell (R)	17D, 15R	67D, 60R, 1IR	Warner Miller (R)	Elbridge G. Lapham (R)	19R, 13D, 1I	Garfield/ Arthur (R) ✓
1883	Grover Cleveland (D) (Note: Resigned to become President of the United States.)	David B. Hill (D)	Joseph Bradford Carr (R)	Leslie W. Russell (R)	Ira Davenport (R)	Robert A. Maxwell (R)	17D, 15R	86D, 38R, 1UL, 1GB, 1ID, 1IR	Warner Miller (R)	Elbridge G. Lapham (R)	21D, 13R	Garfield/ Arthur (R) ✓
1884	Grover Cleveland (D)	David B. Hill (D)	Joseph Bradford Carr (R)	Denis O'Brien (D)	Alfred C. Chapin (D)	Robert A. Maxwell (R)	19R, 13D	72R, 56D	Warner Miller (R)	Elbridge G. Lapham (R)	21D, 13R	Cleveland/ Hendricks (D) ✓
1885	David B. Hill (D)	Dennis McCarthy (R)	Joseph Bradford Carr (R)	Denis O'Brien (D)	Alfred C. Chapin (D)	Robert A. Maxwell (R)	19R, 13D	74R, 54D	Warner Miller (R)	William M. Evarts (R)	17D, 17R	Cleveland/ Hendricks (D) ✓
1886	David B. Hill (D)	Edward F. Jones (D)	Frederick Cook (D)	Denis O'Brien (D)	Alfred C. Chapin (D)	Lawrence J. Fitzgerald (D)	20R, 12D	77R, 49D, 1ID, 1IR	Warner Miller (R)	William M. Evarts (R)	17D, 17R	Cleveland/ Hendricks (D) ✓
1887	David B. Hill (D)	Edward F. Jones (D)	Frederick Cook (D)	Denis O'Brien (D)	Alfred C. Chapin (D)	Lawrence J. Fitzgerald (D)	20R, 12D	74R, 54D	Frank Hiscock (R)	William M. Evarts (R)	19R, 15D	Cleveland/ Hendricks (D) ✓
1888	David B. Hill (D)	Edward F. Jones (D)	Frederick Cook (D)	Charles F. Tabor (D)	Edward Wemple (D)	Lawrence J. Fitzgerald (D)	21R, 11D	72R, 55D, 1ID	Frank Hiscock (R)	William M. Evarts (R)	19R, 15D	Harrison/ Morton (R) ✓
1889	David B. Hill (D)	Edward F. Jones (D)	Frederick Cook (D)	Charles F. Tabor (D)	Edward Wemple (D)	Lawrence J. Fitzgerald (D)	21R, 11D	77R, 51D	Frank Hiscock (R)	William M. Evarts (R)	19R, 15D	Harrison/ Morton (R) ✓
1890	David B. Hill (D)	Edward F. Jones (D)	Frank Rice (D)	Charles F. Tabor (D)	Edward Wemple (D)	Elliot Danforth (D)	19R, 13D	71R, 57D	Frank Hiscock (R)	William M. Evarts (R)	19R, 15D	Harrison/ Morton (R) ✓
1891	David B. Hill (D)	Edward F. Jones (D)	Frank Rice (D)	Charles F. Tabor (D)	Edward Wemple (D)	Elliot Danforth (D)	19R, 13D	68D, 59R, 1IR	Frank Hiscock (R)	William M. Evarts (R)	23D, 11R	Harrison/ Morton (R) ✓
1892	Roswell P. Flower (D)	William F. Sheehan (D)	Frank Rice (D)	Simon W. Rosendale (D)	Frank Campbell (D)	Elliot Danforth (D)	17D, 14R, 1IR	67D, 61R	Frank Hiscock (R)	David B. Hill (D)	23D, 11R	Cleveland/ Stevenson (D) ✓
1893	Roswell P. Flower (D)	William F. Sheehan (D)	Frank Rice (D)	Simon W. Rosendale (D)	Frank Campbell (D)	Elliot Danforth (D)	17D, 14R, 1IR	74D, 54R	Edward Murphy Jr. (D)	David B. Hill (D)	20D, 14R	Cleveland/ Stevenson (D) ✓
1894	Roswell P. Flower (D)	William F. Sheehan (D)	John Palmer (R)	Theodore E. Hancock (R)	James A. Roberts (R)	Addison B. Colvin (R)	19R, 12D, 1ID	71R, 57D	Edward Murphy Jr. (D)	David B. Hill (D)	19D, 15R	Cleveland/ Stevenson (D) ✓
1895	Levi P. Morton (R) (Note: Per the 1894 state constitution, his term was the first to last two years rather than three.)	Charles T. Saxton (R)	John Palmer (R)	Theodore E. Hancock (R)	James A. Roberts (R)	Addison B. Colvin (R)	19R, 12D, 1ID	105R, 23D	Edward Murphy Jr. (D)	David B. Hill (D)	28R, 6D	Cleveland/ Stevenson (D) ✓
1896	Levi P. Morton (R)	Charles T. Saxton (R)	John Palmer (R)	Theodore E. Hancock (R)	James A. Roberts (R)	Addison B. Colvin (R)	35R, 14D, 1IR (Note: Due to a change in the Constitution of New York in 1894, the Senate began to have its elections during even years, with a three-year term with the election of 1895 to allow for a transition.)	103R, 47D	Edward Murphy Jr. (D)	David B. Hill (D)	28R, 6D	McKinley/ Hobart (R) ✓
1897	Frank S. Black (R)	Timothy L. Woodruff (R)	John Palmer (R)	Theodore E. Hancock (R)	James A. Roberts (R)	Addison B. Colvin (R)	35R, 14D, 1IR	114R, 35D, 1I	Edward Murphy Jr. (D)	Thomas C. Platt (R)	28R, 6D	McKinley/ Hobart (R) ✓
1898	Frank S. Black (R)	Timothy L. Woodruff (R)	John Palmer (R)	Theodore E. Hancock (R)	James A. Roberts (R)	Addison B. Colvin (R)	35R, 14D, 1IR	77R, 69D, 3CU, 1IR	Edward Murphy Jr. (D)	Thomas C. Platt (R)	28R, 6D	McKinley/ Hobart (R) ✓
1899	Theodore Roosevelt (R)	Timothy L. Woodruff (R)	John T. McDonough (R)	John C. Davies (R)	William J. Morgan (R)	John P. Jaeckel (R)	27R, 23D	87R, 63D	Chauncey Depew (R)	Thomas C. Platt (R)	18D, 16R	McKinley/ Hobart (R) ✓
1900	Theodore Roosevelt (R)	Timothy L. Woodruff (R)	John T. McDonough (R)	John C. Davies (R)	Theodore P. Gilman (R)	John P. Jaeckel (R)	27R, 23D	92R, 57D, 1 vac.	Chauncey Depew (R)	Thomas C. Platt (R)	18D, 16R	McKinley/ Roosevelt (R) ✓
1901	Benjamin Odell (R)	Timothy L. Woodruff (R)	John T. McDonough (R)	John C. Davies (R)	Erastus C. Knight (R) (Note: Resigned to become Mayor of Buffalo.)	John P. Jaeckel (R)	35R, 15D	105R, 45D	Chauncey Depew (R)	Thomas C. Platt (R)	22R, 12D	McKinley/ Roosevelt (R) ✓
1902	Benjamin Odell (R)	Timothy L. Woodruff (R)	John T. McDonough (R)	John C. Davies (R)	Nathan L. Miller (R) (Note: Appointed to fill unexpired term, reelected, then resigned to become a justice of the New York Supreme Court.)	John P. Jaeckel (R)	35R, 15D	106R, 42D, 2ID	Chauncey Depew (R)	Thomas C. Platt (R)	22R, 12D	McKinley/ Roosevelt (R) ✓
1903	Benjamin Odell (R)	Frank W. Higgins (R)	John F. O'Brien (R)	John Cunneen (D)	Otto Kelsey (R) (Note: Resigned to become New York State Superintendent of Insurance.)	John G. Wickser (R)	28R, 22D	89R, 61D	Chauncey Depew (R)	Thomas C. Platt (R)	20R, 17D	McKinley/ Roosevelt (R) ✓
1904	Benjamin Odell (R)	Frank W. Higgins (R)	John F. O'Brien (R)	John Cunneen (D)	Otto Kelsey (R)	John G. Wickser (R)	28R, 22D	97R, 52D, 1IC	Chauncey Depew (R)	Thomas C. Platt (R)	20R, 17D	Roosevelt/ Fairbanks (R) ✓
1905	Frank W. Higgins (R)	Matthew Linn Bruce (R)	John F. O'Brien (R)	Julius Marshuetz Mayer (R)	Otto Kelsey (R)	John G. Wallenmeier Jr. (R)	31R, 20D	104R, 46D	Chauncey Depew (R)	Thomas C. Platt (R)	26R, 11D	Roosevelt/ Fairbanks (R) ✓
1906	Frank W. Higgins (R)	John Raines (R)	John F. O'Brien (R)	Julius Marshuetz Mayer (R)	William C. Wilson (R)	John G. Wallenmeier Jr. (R)	31R, 20D	111R, 35D, 3MOL, 1ID	Chauncey Depew (R)	Thomas C. Platt (R)	26R, 11D	Roosevelt/ Fairbanks (R) ✓
1907	Charles Evans Hughes (R) (Note: Resigned to take seat as Associate Justice of the U.S. Supreme Court.)	Lewis Stuyvesant Chanler (D)	John Sibley Whalen (D)	William S. Jackson (D)	Martin H. Glynn (D)	Julius Hauser (D)	31R, 20D	98R, 51D, 1IL	Chauncey Depew (R)	Thomas C. Platt (R)	26R, 11D	Roosevelt/ Fairbanks (R) ✓
1908	Charles Evans Hughes (R)	Lewis Stuyvesant Chanler (D)	John Sibley Whalen (D)	William S. Jackson (D)	Martin H. Glynn (D)	Julius Hauser (D)	31R, 20D	96R, 54D	Chauncey Depew (R)	Thomas C. Platt (R)	26R, 11D	Taft/ Sherman (R) ✓
1909	Charles Evans Hughes (R)	Horace White (R)	Samuel S. Koenig (R)	Edward R. O'Malley (R)	Charles H. Gaus (R)	Thomas B. Dunn(R)	35R, 16D	99R, 51D	Chauncey Depew (R)	Elihu Root (R)	25R, 12D	Taft/ Sherman (R) ✓
1909	Charles Evans Hughes (R)	Horace White (R)	Samuel S. Koenig (R)	Edward R. O'Malley (R)	Otto Kelsey (R) (Note: Acted until the appointment of a successor.)	Thomas B. Dunn(R)	35R, 16D	99R, 51D	Chauncey Depew (R)	Elihu Root (R)	25R, 12D	Taft/ Sherman (R) ✓
1910	Horace White (R)	George H. Cobb (R)	Samuel S. Koenig (R)	Edward R. O'Malley (R)	Clark Williams (R)	Thomas B. Dunn(R)	35R, 16D	94R, 56D	Chauncey Depew (R)	Elihu Root (R)	25R, 12D	Taft/ Sherman (R) ✓
1911	John Alden Dix (D)	Thomas F. Conway (D)	Edward Lazansky (D)	Thomas Carmody (D)	William Sohmer (D)	John J. Kennedy (D)	29D, 21R, 1IL	87D, 63R	James A. O'Gorman (D)	Elihu Root (R)	22D, 15R	Taft/ Sherman (R) ✓
1912	John Alden Dix (D)	Thomas F. Conway (D)	Edward Lazansky (D)	Thomas Carmody (D)	William Sohmer (D)	John J. Kennedy (D)	29D, 21R, 1IL	101R, 48D, 1Soc	James A. O'Gorman (D)	Elihu Root (R)	22D, 15R	Wilson/ Marshall (D) ✓
1913	William Sulzer (D) (Note: Impeached and removed from office for campaign contribution fraud.)	Martin H. Glynn (D)	Mitchell May (D)	Thomas Carmody (D)	William Sohmer (D)	John J. Kennedy (D)	33D, 16R, 2Prog	104D, 42R, 4Prog	James A. O'Gorman (D)	Elihu Root (R)	31D, 12R, 1Prog	Wilson/ Marshall (D) ✓
1914	Martin H. Glynn (D)	Robert F. Wagner (D)	Mitchell May (D)	James A. Parsons (D)	William Sohmer (D)	Homer D. Call (Prog) (Note: Elected by Legislature.)	33D, 16R, 2Prog	82R, 48D, 20Prog	James A. O'Gorman (D)	Elihu Root (R)	31D, 12R, 1Prog	Wilson/ Marshall (D) ✓
1915	Charles Seymour Whitman (R)	Edward Schoeneck (R)	Francis Hugo (R)	Egburt E. Woodbury (R)	Eugene M. Travis (R)	James L. Wells (R)	34R, 17D	100R, 50D	James A. O'Gorman (D)	James W. Wadsworth Jr. (R)	23R, 19D, 1Soc	Wilson/ Marshall (D) ✓
1916	Charles Seymour Whitman (R)	Edward Schoeneck (R)	Francis Hugo (R)	Egburt E. Woodbury (R)	Eugene M. Travis (R)	James L. Wells (R)	34R, 17D	97R, 52D, 1Soc	James A. O'Gorman (D)	James W. Wadsworth Jr. (R)	23R, 19D, 1Soc	Hughes/ Fairbanks (R) ✗
1917	Charles Seymour Whitman (R)	Edward Schoeneck (R)	Francis Hugo (R)	Merton E. Lewis (R) (Note: Appointed for remainder of first half of term, elected to fill second half of term.)	Eugene M. Travis (R)	James L. Wells (R)	36R, 15D	100R, 48D, 2Soc	William M. Calder (R)	James W. Wadsworth Jr. (R)	26R, 16D, 1Soc	Hughes/ Fairbanks (R) ✗
1918	Charles Seymour Whitman (R)	Edward Schoeneck (R)	Francis Hugo (R)	Merton E. Lewis (R)	Eugene M. Travis (R)	James L. Wells (R)	36R, 15D	96R, 44D, 10Soc	William M. Calder (R)	James W. Wadsworth Jr. (R)	26R, 16D, 1Soc	Hughes/ Fairbanks (R) ✗
1919	Al Smith (D)	Harry C. Walker (D)	Francis Hugo (R)	Charles D. Newton (R)	Eugene M. Travis (R)	James L. Wells (R)	29R, 22D	94R, 54D, 2Soc	William M. Calder (R)	James W. Wadsworth Jr. (R)	24R, 19D	Hughes/ Fairbanks (R) ✗
1920	Al Smith (D)	Harry C. Walker (D)	Francis Hugo (R)	Charles D. Newton (R)	Eugene M. Travis (R)	James L. Wells (R)	29R, 22D	111R, 34D, 5Soc	William M. Calder (R)	James W. Wadsworth Jr. (R)	24R, 19D	Harding/ Coolidge (R) ✓
1921	Nathan L. Miller (R)	Jeremiah Wood (R)	John J. Lyons (R)	Charles D. Newton (R)	James A. Wendell (R)	N. Monroe Marshall (R)	39R, 11D, 1Soc	119R, 28D, 3S	William M. Calder (R)	James W. Wadsworth Jr. (R)	33R, 9D, 1Soc	Harding/ Coolidge (R) ✓
1922	Nathan L. Miller (R)	Jeremiah Wood (R)	John J. Lyons (R)	Charles D. Newton (R)	William J. Maier (R)	N. Monroe Marshall (R)	39R, 11D, 1Soc	96R, 53D, 1Soc	William M. Calder (R)	James W. Wadsworth Jr. (R)	33R, 9D, 1Soc	Harding/ Coolidge (R) ✓
1923	Al Smith (D)	George R. Lunn (D)	James A. Hamilton (D)	Carl Sherman (D)	James W. Fleming (D)	George K. Shuler (D)	26D, 25R	81R, 69D	Royal S. Copeland (D)	James W. Wadsworth Jr. (R)	21R, 21D, 1 vac.	Harding/ Coolidge (R) ✓
1924	Al Smith (D)	George R. Lunn (D)	James A. Hamilton (D)	Carl Sherman (D)	James W. Fleming (D)	George K. Shuler (D)	26D, 25R	86R, 64D	Royal S. Copeland (D)	James W. Wadsworth Jr. (R)	22D, 21R	Coolidge/ Dawes (R) ✓
1925	Al Smith (D)	Seymour Lowman (R)	Florence E. S. Knapp (R)	Albert Ottinger (R)	Vincent B. Murphy (R)	Lewis H. Pounds (R)	29R, 22D	96R, 54D	Royal S. Copeland (D)	James W. Wadsworth Jr. (R)	22D, 21R	Coolidge/ Dawes (R) ✓
1926	Al Smith (D)	Seymour Lowman (R)	Florence E. S. Knapp (R)	Albert Ottinger (R)	Vincent B. Murphy (R)	Lewis H. Pounds (R)	29R, 22D	91R, 59D	Royal S. Copeland (D)	James W. Wadsworth Jr. (R)	22D, 21R	Coolidge/ Dawes (R) ✓

== 1927–present ==
Year	Executive offices				State Legislature		United States Congress			Electoral votes
Year	Governor	Lt. Governor	Attorney General	Comptroller	Senate	Assembly	Senator (Class I)	Senator (Class III)	House	Electoral votes
1927	Al Smith (D)	Edwin Corning (D)	Albert Ottinger (R)	Morris S. Tremaine (D)	27R, 24D	84R, 66D	Royal S. Copeland (D)	Robert F. Wagner (D)	25D, 18R	
1928	Al Smith (D)	Edwin Corning (D)	Albert Ottinger (R)	Morris S. Tremaine (D)	27R, 24D	88R, 62D	Royal S. Copeland (D)	Robert F. Wagner (D)	25D, 18R	Hoover/ Curtis (R) ✓
1929	Franklin D. Roosevelt (D)	Herbert H. Lehman (D)	Hamilton Ward Jr. (R)	Morris S. Tremaine (D)	27R, 24D	89R, 61D	Royal S. Copeland (D)	Robert F. Wagner (D)	23D, 20R	Hoover/ Curtis (R) ✓
1930	Franklin D. Roosevelt (D)	Herbert H. Lehman (D)	Hamilton Ward Jr. (R)	Morris S. Tremaine (D)	27R, 24D	86R, 63D, 1 vac.	Royal S. Copeland (D)	Robert F. Wagner (D)	23D, 20R	Hoover/ Curtis (R) ✓
1931	Franklin D. Roosevelt (D)	Herbert H. Lehman (D)	John J. Bennett Jr. (D)	Morris S. Tremaine (D)	26R, 25D	80R, 70D	Royal S. Copeland (D)	Robert F. Wagner (D)	22D, 20R, 1 vac.	Hoover/ Curtis (R) ✓
1932	Franklin D. Roosevelt (D)	Herbert H. Lehman (D)	John J. Bennett Jr. (D)	Morris S. Tremaine (D)	26R, 25D	80R, 70D	Royal S. Copeland (D)	Robert F. Wagner (D)	23D, 20R	Roosevelt/ Garner (D) ✓
1933	Herbert H. Lehman (D) (Note: Resigned when appointed Director of Foreign Relief and Rehabilitation Operations for the United States Department of State.)	M. William Bray (D)	John J. Bennett Jr. (D)	Morris S. Tremaine (D)	26D, 25R	77R, 73D	Royal S. Copeland (D)	Robert F. Wagner (D)	29D, 16R	Roosevelt/ Garner (D) ✓
1934	Herbert H. Lehman (D)	M. William Bray (D)	John J. Bennett Jr. (D)	Morris S. Tremaine (D)	26D, 25R	85R, 65D	Royal S. Copeland (D)	Robert F. Wagner (D)	29D, 16R	Roosevelt/ Garner (D) ✓
1935	Herbert H. Lehman (D)	M. William Bray (D)	John J. Bennett Jr. (D)	Morris S. Tremaine (D)	29D, 22R	77D, 73R	Royal S. Copeland (D)	Robert F. Wagner (D)	29D, 16R	Roosevelt/ Garner (D) ✓
1936	Herbert H. Lehman (D)	M. William Bray (D)	John J. Bennett Jr. (D)	Morris S. Tremaine (D)	29D, 22R	82R, 67D, 1 vac.	Royal S. Copeland (D)	Robert F. Wagner (D)	29D, 16R	Roosevelt/ Garner (D) ✓
1937	Herbert H. Lehman (D)	M. William Bray (D)	John J. Bennett Jr. (D)	Morris S. Tremaine (D)	29D, 22R	76R, 74D	Royal S. Copeland (D)	Robert F. Wagner (D)	29D, 16R	Roosevelt/ Garner (D) ✓
1938	Herbert H. Lehman (D)	M. William Bray (D)	John J. Bennett Jr. (D)	Morris S. Tremaine (D)	29D, 22R	84R, 65D, 5AL	James M. Mead (D) (Note: Appointed to fill remainder of term, then subsequently elected to in his own right.)	Robert F. Wagner (D)	28D, 17R	Roosevelt/ Garner (D) ✓
1939	Herbert H. Lehman (D)	Charles Poletti (D)	John J. Bennett Jr. (D)	Morris S. Tremaine (D)	27R, 24D	85R, 64D, 1AL	James M. Mead (D)	Robert F. Wagner (D)	25D, 19R, 1AL	Roosevelt/ Garner (D) ✓
1940	Herbert H. Lehman (D)	Charles Poletti (D)	John J. Bennett Jr. (D)	Morris S. Tremaine (D)	27R, 24D	85R, 64D, 1AL	James M. Mead (D)	Robert F. Wagner (D)	25D, 19R, 1AL	Roosevelt/ Wallace (D) ✓
1941	Herbert H. Lehman (D)	Charles Poletti (D)	John J. Bennett Jr. (D)	Harry D. Yates (D)	30R, 21D	87R, 62D, 1AL	James M. Mead (D)	Robert F. Wagner (D)	25D, 19R, 1AL	Roosevelt/ Wallace (D) ✓
1942	Charles Poletti (D)	Joe R. Hanley (R)	John J. Bennett Jr. (D)	Joseph V. O'Leary (AL)	30R, 21D	87R, 62D, 1AL	James M. Mead (D)	Robert F. Wagner (D)	25D, 19R, 1AL	Roosevelt/ Wallace (D) ✓
1943	Thomas E. Dewey (R)	Thomas W. Wallace (R)	Nathaniel L. Goldstein (R)	Frank C. Moore (R)	31R, 20D	90R, 59D, 1AL	James M. Mead (D)	Robert F. Wagner (D)	23R, 21D, 1AL	Roosevelt/ Wallace (D) ✓
1944	Thomas E. Dewey (R)	Joe R. Hanley (R) (Note: As majority Leader of the New York State Senate, served as Acting Lt. Governor upon succession of Lt. Governor to Governor, then elected in his own right.)	Nathaniel L. Goldstein (R)	Frank C. Moore (R)	31R, 20D	90R, 59D, 1AL	James M. Mead (D)	Robert F. Wagner (D)	22D, 22R, 1AL	Roosevelt/ Truman (D) ✓
1945	Thomas E. Dewey (R)	Joe R. Hanley (R)	Nathaniel L. Goldstein (R)	Frank C. Moore (R)	35R, 21D	94R, 55D, 1AL	James M. Mead (D)	Robert F. Wagner (D)	22D, 22R, 1AL	Roosevelt/ Truman (D) ✓
1946	Thomas E. Dewey (R)	Joe R. Hanley (R)	Nathaniel L. Goldstein (R)	Frank C. Moore (R)	35R, 21D	94R, 55D, 1AL	James M. Mead (D)	Robert F. Wagner (D)	22D, 22R, 1AL	Roosevelt/ Truman (D) ✓
1947	Thomas E. Dewey (R)	Joe R. Hanley (R)	Nathaniel L. Goldstein (R)	Frank C. Moore (R)	41R, 14D, 1AL	109R, 40D, 1AL	Irving Ives (R)	Robert F. Wagner (D)	28R, 15D, 2AL	Roosevelt/ Truman (D) ✓
1948	Thomas E. Dewey (R)	Joe R. Hanley (R)	Nathaniel L. Goldstein (R)	Frank C. Moore (R)	41R, 14D, 1AL	109R, 40D, 1AL	Irving Ives (R)	Robert F. Wagner (D)	28R, 15D, 2AL	Dewey/ Warren (R) ✗
1949	Thomas E. Dewey (R)	Joe R. Hanley (R)	Nathaniel L. Goldstein (R)	Frank C. Moore (R)	31R, 25D	87R, 63D	Irving Ives (R)	John Foster Dulles (R)	23D, 20R, 1AL	Dewey/ Warren (R) ✗
1950	Thomas E. Dewey (R)	Joe R. Hanley (R)	Nathaniel L. Goldstein (R)	Frank C. Moore (R)	31R, 25D	87R, 63D	Irving Ives (R)	Herbert H. Lehman (D)	22D, 20R, 1AL, 1Lib	Dewey/ Warren (R) ✗
1951	Thomas E. Dewey (R)	Frank C. Moore (R) (Note: Resigned to become President of Nelson Rockefeller's Government Affairs Foundation.)	Nathaniel L. Goldstein (R)	J. Raymond McGovern (R)	32R, 23D, 1AL	87R, 63D	Irving Ives (R)	Herbert H. Lehman (D)	23D, 22R	Dewey/ Warren (R) ✗
1952	Thomas E. Dewey (R)	Frank C. Moore (R)	Nathaniel L. Goldstein (R)	J. Raymond McGovern (R)	32R, 23D, 1AL	87R, 63D	Irving Ives (R)	Herbert H. Lehman (D)	23R, 22D	Eisenhower/ Nixon (R) ✓
1953	Thomas E. Dewey (R)	Arthur H. Wicks (R) (Note: Forced to resign when it became known that he had made frequent visits to convicted labor leader Joseph S. Fay while the latter was incarcerated at Sing Sing prison.)	Nathaniel L. Goldstein (R)	J. Raymond McGovern (R)	37R, 19D	98R, 52D	Irving Ives (R)	Herbert H. Lehman (D)	27R, 16D	Eisenhower/ Nixon (R) ✓
1954	Thomas E. Dewey (R)	Walter J. Mahoney (R)	Nathaniel L. Goldstein (R)	J. Raymond McGovern (R)	37R, 19D	98R, 52D	Irving Ives (R)	Herbert H. Lehman (D)	27R, 16D	Eisenhower/ Nixon (R) ✓
1955	W. Averell Harriman (D)	George DeLuca (D)	Jacob Javits (R)	Arthur Levitt Sr. (D)	34R, 24D	90R, 60D	Irving Ives (R)	Herbert H. Lehman (D)	26R, 17D	Eisenhower/ Nixon (R) ✓
1956	W. Averell Harriman (D)	George DeLuca (D)	Jacob Javits (R)	Arthur Levitt Sr. (D)	34R, 24D	90R, 60D	Irving Ives (R)	Herbert H. Lehman (D)	26R, 17D	Eisenhower/ Nixon (R) ✓
1957	W. Averell Harriman (D)	George DeLuca (D)	Louis J. Lefkowitz (R) (Note: Elected by State Legislature to fill unexpired term, later elected in their own right.)	Arthur Levitt Sr. (D)	38R, 20D	96R, 54D	Irving Ives (R)	Jacob Javits (R)	26R, 17D	Eisenhower/ Nixon (R) ✓
1958	W. Averell Harriman (D)	George DeLuca (D)	Louis J. Lefkowitz (R)	Arthur Levitt Sr. (D)	38R, 20D	96R, 54D	Irving Ives (R)	Jacob Javits (R)	26R, 17D	Eisenhower/ Nixon (R) ✓
1959	Nelson Rockefeller (R) (Note: Resigned to devote himself to his Commission on Critical Choices for Americans.)	Malcolm Wilson (R)	Louis J. Lefkowitz (R)	Arthur Levitt Sr. (D)	34R, 24D	92R, 58D	Kenneth Keating (R)	Jacob Javits (R)	24R, 19D	Eisenhower/ Nixon (R) ✓
1960	Nelson Rockefeller (R)	Malcolm Wilson (R)	Louis J. Lefkowitz (R)	Arthur Levitt Sr. (D)	34R, 24D	92R, 58D	Kenneth Keating (R)	Jacob Javits (R)	24R, 19D	Kennedy/ Johnson (D) ✓
1961	Nelson Rockefeller (R)	Malcolm Wilson (R)	Louis J. Lefkowitz (R)	Arthur Levitt Sr. (D)	33R, 25D	84R, 66D	Kenneth Keating (R)	Jacob Javits (R)	22D, 21R	Kennedy/ Johnson (D) ✓
1962	Nelson Rockefeller (R)	Malcolm Wilson (R)	Louis J. Lefkowitz (R)	Arthur Levitt Sr. (D)	33R, 25D	84R, 66D	Kenneth Keating (R)	Jacob Javits (R)	22D, 21R	Kennedy/ Johnson (D) ✓
1963	Nelson Rockefeller (R)	Malcolm Wilson (R)	Louis J. Lefkowitz (R)	Arthur Levitt Sr. (D)	33R, 25D	85R, 65D	Kenneth Keating (R)	Jacob Javits (R)	21R, 20D	Kennedy/ Johnson (D) ✓
1964	Nelson Rockefeller (R)	Malcolm Wilson (R)	Louis J. Lefkowitz (R)	Arthur Levitt Sr. (D)	33R, 25D	85R, 65D	Kenneth Keating (R)	Jacob Javits (R)	21R, 20D	Johnson/ Humphrey (D) ✓
1965	Nelson Rockefeller (R)	Malcolm Wilson (R)	Louis J. Lefkowitz (R)	Arthur Levitt Sr. (D)	33D, 25R	88D, 62R	Robert F. Kennedy (D)	Jacob Javits (R)	27D, 14R	Johnson/ Humphrey (D) ✓
1966	Nelson Rockefeller (R)	Malcolm Wilson (R)	Louis J. Lefkowitz (R)	Arthur Levitt Sr. (D)	37R, 28D	90D, 75R	Robert F. Kennedy (D)	Jacob Javits (R)	27D, 14R	Johnson/ Humphrey (D) ✓
1967	Nelson Rockefeller (R)	Malcolm Wilson (R)	Louis J. Lefkowitz (R)	Arthur Levitt Sr. (D)	31R, 26D	80D, 70R	Robert F. Kennedy (D)	Jacob Javits (R)	26D, 15R	Johnson/ Humphrey (D) ✓
1968	Nelson Rockefeller (R)	Malcolm Wilson (R)	Louis J. Lefkowitz (R)	Arthur Levitt Sr. (D)	31R, 26D	80D, 70R	Robert F. Kennedy (D)	Jacob Javits (R)	26D, 15R	Humphrey/ Muskie (D) ✗
1969	Nelson Rockefeller (R)	Malcolm Wilson (R)	Louis J. Lefkowitz (R)	Arthur Levitt Sr. (D)	33R, 24D	76R, 72D, 2Con (Note: Conservative member(s) caucused with the Republicans.)	Charles Goodell (R)	Jacob Javits (R)	26D, 15R	Humphrey/ Muskie (D) ✗
1970	Nelson Rockefeller (R)	Malcolm Wilson (R)	Louis J. Lefkowitz (R)	Arthur Levitt Sr. (D)	33R, 24D	76R, 72D, 2Con	Charles Goodell (R)	Jacob Javits (R)	26D, 15R	Humphrey/ Muskie (D) ✗
1971	Nelson Rockefeller (R)	Malcolm Wilson (R)	Louis J. Lefkowitz (R)	Arthur Levitt Sr. (D)	32R, 25D	77R, 70D, 2Con, 1UMAB (Note: Conservative member(s) caucused with the Republicans. John J. Walsh, a registered Democrat, ran for re-election on the ticket of an "Upper Manhattan Apartment Building Party", and defeated the regular Democratic candidate Edward H. Lehner)	James L. Buckley (Con)	Jacob Javits (R)	26D, 15R	Humphrey/ Muskie (D) ✗
1972	Nelson Rockefeller (R)	Malcolm Wilson (R)	Louis J. Lefkowitz (R)	Arthur Levitt Sr. (D)	32R, 25D	77R, 70D, 2Con, 1UMAB	James L. Buckley (Con)	Jacob Javits (R)	26D, 15R	Nixon/ Agnew (R) ✓
1973	Nelson Rockefeller (R)	Malcolm Wilson (R)	Louis J. Lefkowitz (R)	Arthur Levitt Sr. (D)	37R, 23D	83R, 66D, 1Con	James L. Buckley (Con)	Jacob Javits (R)	22D, 17R	Nixon/ Agnew (R) ✓
1973	Malcolm Wilson (R)	Warren M. Anderson (R)	Louis J. Lefkowitz (R)	Arthur Levitt Sr. (D)	37R, 23D	83R, 66D, 1Con	James L. Buckley (Con)	Jacob Javits (R)	22D, 17R	Nixon/ Agnew (R) ✓
1974	Malcolm Wilson (R)	Warren M. Anderson (R)	Louis J. Lefkowitz (R)	Arthur Levitt Sr. (D)	37R, 23D	83R, 66D, 1Con	James L. Buckley (Con)	Jacob Javits (R)	22D, 17R	Nixon/ Agnew (R) ✓
1975	Hugh Carey (D)	Mary Anne Krupsak (D)	Louis J. Lefkowitz (R)	Arthur Levitt Sr. (D)	34R, 26D	88D, 62R	James L. Buckley (Con)	Jacob Javits (R)	27D, 12R	Nixon/ Agnew (R) ✓
1976	Hugh Carey (D)	Mary Anne Krupsak (D)	Louis J. Lefkowitz (R)	Arthur Levitt Sr. (D)	34R, 26D	88D, 62R	James L. Buckley (Con)	Jacob Javits (R)	27D, 12R	Carter/ Mondale (D) ✓
1977	Hugh Carey (D)	Mary Anne Krupsak (D)	Louis J. Lefkowitz (R)	Arthur Levitt Sr. (D)	35R, 25D	90D, 60R	Daniel Patrick; Moynihan (D)	Jacob Javits (R)	28D, 11R	Carter/ Mondale (D) ✓
1978	Hugh Carey (D)	Mary Anne Krupsak (D)	Louis J. Lefkowitz (R)	Arthur Levitt Sr. (D)	35R, 25D	90D, 60R	Daniel Patrick; Moynihan (D)	Jacob Javits (R)	27D, 12R	Carter/ Mondale (D) ✓
1979	Hugh Carey (D)	Mario Cuomo (D)	Robert Abrams (D)	Edward Regan (R)	35R, 25D	86D, 64R	Daniel Patrick; Moynihan (D)	Jacob Javits (R)	26D, 13R	Carter/ Mondale (D) ✓
1980	Hugh Carey (D)	Mario Cuomo (D)	Robert Abrams (D)	Edward Regan (R)	35R, 25D	86D, 64R	Daniel Patrick; Moynihan (D)	Jacob Javits (R)	26D, 13R	Reagan/ Bush (R) ✓
1981	Hugh Carey (D)	Mario Cuomo (D)	Robert Abrams (D)	Edward Regan (R)	35R, 25D	85D, 64R, 1Lib (Note: Members of the Liberal, Independence, and Working Families parties caucused with Democrats.)	Daniel Patrick; Moynihan (D)	Al D'Amato (R)	22D, 17R	Reagan/ Bush (R) ✓
1982	Hugh Carey (D)	Mario Cuomo (D)	Robert Abrams (D)	Edward Regan (R)	35R, 25D	85D, 64R, 1Lib	Daniel Patrick; Moynihan (D)	Al D'Amato (R)	22D, 17R	Reagan/ Bush (R) ✓
1983	Mario Cuomo (D)	Alfred DelBello (D)	Robert Abrams (D)	Edward Regan (R)	35R, 26D	98D, 52R	Daniel Patrick; Moynihan (D)	Al D'Amato (R)	20D, 14R	Reagan/ Bush (R) ✓
1984	Mario Cuomo (D)	Alfred DelBello (D)	Robert Abrams (D)	Edward Regan (R)	35R, 26D	98D, 52R	Daniel Patrick; Moynihan (D)	Al D'Amato (R)	20D, 14R	Reagan/ Bush (R) ✓
1985	Mario Cuomo (D)	Alfred DelBello (D)	Robert Abrams (D)	Edward Regan (R)	35R, 26D	92D, 56R, 2Lib	Daniel Patrick; Moynihan (D)	Al D'Amato (R)	19D, 15R	Reagan/ Bush (R) ✓
1986	Mario Cuomo (D)	Warren M. Anderson (R)	Robert Abrams (D)	Edward Regan (R)	35R, 26D	92D, 56R, 2Lib	Daniel Patrick; Moynihan (D)	Al D'Amato (R)	19D, 15R	Reagan/ Bush (R) ✓
1987	Mario Cuomo (D)	Stan Lundine (D)	Robert Abrams (D)	Edward Regan (R)	35R, 26D	92D, 58R	Daniel Patrick; Moynihan (D)	Al D'Amato (R)	20D, 14R	Reagan/ Bush (R) ✓
1988	Mario Cuomo (D)	Stan Lundine (D)	Robert Abrams (D)	Edward Regan (R)	35R, 26D	92D, 58R	Daniel Patrick; Moynihan (D)	Al D'Amato (R)	20D, 14R	Dukakis/ Bentsen (D) ✗
1989	Mario Cuomo (D)	Stan Lundine (D)	Robert Abrams (D)	Edward Regan (R)	34R, 27D	92D, 58R	Daniel Patrick; Moynihan (D)	Al D'Amato (R)	21D, 13R	Dukakis/ Bentsen (D) ✗
1990	Mario Cuomo (D)	Stan Lundine (D)	Robert Abrams (D)	Edward Regan (R)	34R, 27D	92D, 58R	Daniel Patrick; Moynihan (D)	Al D'Amato (R)	21D, 13R	Dukakis/ Bentsen (D) ✗
1991	Mario Cuomo (D)	Stan Lundine (D)	Robert Abrams (D)	Edward Regan (R)	35R, 26D	95D, 55R	Daniel Patrick; Moynihan (D)	Al D'Amato (R)	21D, 13R	Dukakis/ Bentsen (D) ✗
1992	Mario Cuomo (D)	Stan Lundine (D)	Robert Abrams (D)	Edward Regan (R)	35R, 26D	95D, 55R	Daniel Patrick; Moynihan (D)	Al D'Amato (R)	21D, 13R	Clinton/ Gore (D) ✓
1993	Mario Cuomo (D)	Stan Lundine (D)	Robert Abrams (D)	Edward Regan (R)	35R, 26D	100D, 50R	Daniel Patrick; Moynihan (D)	Al D'Amato (R)	18D, 13R	Clinton/ Gore (D) ✓
1994	Mario Cuomo (D)	Stan Lundine (D)	Oliver Koppell (D)	H. Carl McCall (D)	35R, 26D	100D, 50R	Daniel Patrick; Moynihan (D)	Al D'Amato (R)	18D, 13R	Clinton/ Gore (D) ✓
1995	George Pataki (R)	Betsy McCaughey (R)	Dennis Vacco (R)	H. Carl McCall (D)	36R, 25D	95D, 55R	Daniel Patrick; Moynihan (D)	Al D'Amato (R)	17D, 14R	Clinton/ Gore (D) ✓
1996	George Pataki (R)	Betsy McCaughey (R)	Dennis Vacco (R)	H. Carl McCall (D)	36R, 25D	95D, 55R	Daniel Patrick; Moynihan (D)	Al D'Amato (R)	17D, 14R	Clinton/ Gore (D) ✓
1997	George Pataki (R)	Betsy McCaughey (D) (Note: Switched parties after not being selected to be Governor Pataki's running mate for the 1998 election.)	Dennis Vacco (R)	H. Carl McCall (D)	35R, 26D	95D, 55R	Daniel Patrick; Moynihan (D)	Al D'Amato (R)	18D, 13R	Clinton/ Gore (D) ✓
1998	George Pataki (R)	Betsy McCaughey (D)	Dennis Vacco (R)	H. Carl McCall (D)	35R, 26D	95D, 55R	Daniel Patrick; Moynihan (D)	Al D'Amato (R)	18D, 13R	Clinton/ Gore (D) ✓
1999	George Pataki (R)	Mary Donohue (R)	Eliot Spitzer (D)	H. Carl McCall (D)	35R, 26D	98D, 52R	Daniel Patrick; Moynihan (D)	Chuck Schumer (D)	19D, 12R	Clinton/ Gore (D) ✓
2000	George Pataki (R)	Mary Donohue (R)	Eliot Spitzer (D)	H. Carl McCall (D)	35R, 26D	98D, 52R	Daniel Patrick; Moynihan (D)	Chuck Schumer (D)	19D, 12R	Gore/ Lieberman (D) ✗
2001	George Pataki (R)	Mary Donohue (R)	Eliot Spitzer (D)	H. Carl McCall (D)	36R, 25D	98D, 52R	Hillary Clinton (D)	Chuck Schumer (D)	19D, 12R	Gore/ Lieberman (D) ✗
2002	George Pataki (R)	Mary Donohue (R)	Eliot Spitzer (D)	H. Carl McCall (D)	36R, 25D	98D, 52R	Hillary Clinton (D)	Chuck Schumer (D)	19D, 12R	Gore/ Lieberman (D) ✗
2003	George Pataki (R)	Mary Donohue (R)	Eliot Spitzer (D)	Alan Hevesi (D) (Note: Re-elected in 2006, but resigned prior to beginning of the new term.)	37R, 25D	102D, 48R	Hillary Clinton (D)	Chuck Schumer (D)	19D, 10R	Gore/ Lieberman (D) ✗
2004	George Pataki (R)	Mary Donohue (R)	Eliot Spitzer (D)	Alan Hevesi (D)	37R, 25D	102D, 48R	Hillary Clinton (D)	Chuck Schumer (D)	19D, 10R	Kerry/ Edwards (D) ✗
2005	George Pataki (R)	Mary Donohue (R)	Eliot Spitzer (D)	Alan Hevesi (D)	35R, 27D	104D, 46R	Hillary Clinton (D)	Chuck Schumer (D)	20D, 9R	Kerry/ Edwards (D) ✗
2006	George Pataki (R)	Mary Donohue (R)	Eliot Spitzer (D)	Alan Hevesi (D)	35R, 27D	103D, 47R	Hillary Clinton (D)	Chuck Schumer (D)	20D, 9R	Kerry/ Edwards (D) ✗
2007	Eliot Spitzer (D)	David Paterson (D)	Andrew Cuomo (D)	Thomas DiNapoli (D)	33R, 29D	106D, 42R, 1Ind, 1WF	Hillary Clinton (D)	Chuck Schumer (D)	23D, 6R	Kerry/ Edwards (D) ✗
2008	Eliot Spitzer (D)	David Paterson (D)	Andrew Cuomo (D)	Thomas DiNapoli (D)	33R, 29D	106D, 42R, 1Ind, 1WF	Hillary Clinton (D)	Chuck Schumer (D)	23D, 6R	Obama/ Biden (D) ✓
2008	David Paterson (D)	Joseph Bruno (R)	Andrew Cuomo (D)	Thomas DiNapoli (D)	32R, 30D	106D, 42R, 1Ind, 1WF	Hillary Clinton (D)	Chuck Schumer (D)	23D, 6R	Obama/ Biden (D) ✓
2008	David Paterson (D)	Dean Skelos (R)	Andrew Cuomo (D)	Thomas DiNapoli (D)	32R, 30D	106D, 42R, 1Ind, 1WF	Hillary Clinton (D)	Chuck Schumer (D)	23D, 6R	Obama/ Biden (D) ✓
2009	David Paterson (D)	Malcolm Smith (D)	Andrew Cuomo (D)	Thomas DiNapoli (D)	32D, 30R (Note: Democrats Pedro Espada Jr. and Hiram Monserrate briefly interrupted the majority by voting for a Republican organizing resolution, precipitating the 2009 New York State Senate leadership crisis. Democrats ended up retaining their majority for the remainder of the term.)	107D, 41R, 1Ind, 1WF	Kirsten Gillibrand (D)	Chuck Schumer (D)	26D, 3R	Obama/ Biden (D) ✓
2009	David Paterson (D)	Pedro Espada Jr. (D)	Andrew Cuomo (D)	Thomas DiNapoli (D)	32D, 30R	107D, 41R, 1Ind, 1WF	Kirsten Gillibrand (D)	Chuck Schumer (D)	26D, 3R	Obama/ Biden (D) ✓
2009	David Paterson (D)	Richard Ravitch (D)	Andrew Cuomo (D)	Thomas DiNapoli (D)	32D, 30R	107D, 41R, 1Ind, 1WF	Kirsten Gillibrand (D)	Chuck Schumer (D)	26D, 3R	Obama/ Biden (D) ✓
2010	David Paterson (D)	Richard Ravitch (D)	Andrew Cuomo (D)	Thomas DiNapoli (D)	32D, 30R	107D, 41R, 1Ind, 1WF	Kirsten Gillibrand (D)	Chuck Schumer (D)	27D, 2R (Note: Republican John M. McHugh of the 23rd district resigned from Congress on September 21, 2009, after being confirmed as the United States Secretary of the Army. Democrat Bill Owens won a special election to succeed him on November 3, 2009.)	Obama/ Biden (D) ✓
2011	Andrew Cuomo (D)	Robert Duffy (D)	Eric Schneiderman (D)	Thomas DiNapoli (D)	37R/IDC, 26D	98D, 51R, 1Ind	Kirsten Gillibrand (D)	Chuck Schumer (D)	21D, 8R (Note: Democrats and Republicans each flipped one seat in special elections held in 2011, keeping the partisan composition the same as after the 2010 elections.)	Obama/ Biden (D) ✓
2012	Andrew Cuomo (D)	Robert Duffy (D)	Eric Schneiderman (D)	Thomas DiNapoli (D)	37R/IDC, 26D	98D, 51R, 1Ind	Kirsten Gillibrand (D)	Chuck Schumer (D)	21D, 8R	Obama/ Biden (D) ✓
2013	Andrew Cuomo (D)	Robert Duffy (D)	Eric Schneiderman (D)	Thomas DiNapoli (D)	35R/IDC, 28D (Note: Members of the Independent Democratic Conference, along with one other Democratic Senator, Simcha Felder, formed a power-sharing deal with the Republicans.)	105D, 44R, 1Ind	Kirsten Gillibrand (D)	Chuck Schumer (D)	21D, 6R	Obama/ Biden (D) ✓
2014	Andrew Cuomo (D)	Robert Duffy (D)	Eric Schneiderman (D)	Thomas DiNapoli (D)	35R/IDC, 28D	105D, 44R, 1Ind	Kirsten Gillibrand (D)	Chuck Schumer (D)	21D, 6R	Obama/ Biden (D) ✓
2015	Andrew Cuomo (D)	Kathy Hochul (D)	Eric Schneiderman (D)	Thomas DiNapoli (D)	37R/IDC, 26D	105D, 43R, 1Ind, 1Con	Kirsten Gillibrand (D)	Chuck Schumer (D)	18D, 9R	Obama/ Biden (D) ✓
2016	Andrew Cuomo (D)	Kathy Hochul (D)	Eric Schneiderman (D)	Thomas DiNapoli (D)	37R/IDC, 26D	105D, 43R, 1Ind, 1Con	Kirsten Gillibrand (D)	Chuck Schumer (D)	18D, 9R	Clinton/ Kaine (D) ✗
2017	Andrew Cuomo (D)	Kathy Hochul (D)	Eric Schneiderman (D)	Thomas DiNapoli (D)	39R/IDC, 24D	106D, 43R, 1Ind	Kirsten Gillibrand (D)	Chuck Schumer (D)	18D, 9R	Clinton/ Kaine (D) ✗
2018	Andrew Cuomo (D)	Kathy Hochul (D)	Barbara Underwood (D) (Note: Was Acting Attorney General from May 8 to May 22, was subsequently appointed May 22 by the New York Legislature to serve out the remainder of Schneiderman's term.)	Thomas DiNapoli (D)	39R/IDC, 24D	106D, 43R, 1Ind	Kirsten Gillibrand (D)	Chuck Schumer (D)	18D, 9R	Clinton/ Kaine (D) ✗
2019	Andrew Cuomo (D)	Kathy Hochul (D)	Letitia James (D)	Thomas DiNapoli (D)	39D, 23R, 1ID	106D, 43R, 1Ind	Kirsten Gillibrand (D)	Chuck Schumer (D)	21D, 6R	Clinton/ Kaine (D) ✗
2020	Andrew Cuomo (D)	Kathy Hochul (D)	Letitia James (D)	Thomas DiNapoli (D)	40D, 23R (Note: Democratic Senator Simcha Felder, who had caucused with the Republican majority, was without a caucus until July 2019 when he was accepted into the Democratic majority.)	106D, 43R, 1Ind	Kirsten Gillibrand (D)	Chuck Schumer (D)	21D, 6R	Biden/ Harris (D) ✓
2021	Andrew Cuomo (D)	Kathy Hochul (D)	Letitia James (D)	Thomas DiNapoli (D)	43D, 20R	106D, 43R, 1Ind	Kirsten Gillibrand (D)	Chuck Schumer (D)	19D, 8R	Biden/ Harris (D) ✓
2021	Kathy Hochul (D)	Brian Benjamin (D) (Note: Senate Temporary President Andrea Stewart-Cousins (D) served as Acting Lieutenant Governor from August 24–September 9, 2021)	Letitia James (D)	Thomas DiNapoli (D)	43D, 20R	106D, 43R, 1Ind	Kirsten Gillibrand (D)	Chuck Schumer (D)	19D, 8R	Biden/ Harris (D) ✓
2022	Kathy Hochul (D)	Brian Benjamin (D)	Letitia James (D)	Thomas DiNapoli (D)	43D, 20R	106D, 43R, 1Ind	Kirsten Gillibrand (D)	Chuck Schumer (D)	19D, 8R	Biden/ Harris (D) ✓
2022	Kathy Hochul (D)	Antonio Delgado (D) (Note: Senate Temporary President Andrea Stewart-Cousins (D) served as Acting Lieutenant Governor from April 12–May 25, 2022)	Letitia James (D)	Thomas DiNapoli (D)	43D, 20R	107D, 43R (Note: Independence Assemblyman Fred Thiele joined the Democratic Party on May 5, 2022.)	Kirsten Gillibrand (D)	Chuck Schumer (D)	19D, 8R	Biden/ Harris (D) ✓
2023	Kathy Hochul (D)	Antonio Delgado (D)	Letitia James (D)	Thomas DiNapoli (D)	42D, 21R	102D, 48R	Kirsten Gillibrand (D)	Chuck Schumer (D)	15D, 11R	Biden/ Harris (D) ✓
2024	Kathy Hochul (D)	Antonio Delgado (D)	Letitia James (D)	Thomas DiNapoli (D)	42D, 21R	102D, 48R	Kirsten Gillibrand (D)	Chuck Schumer (D)	16D, 10R (Note: Republican George Santos of the 3rd district was expelled from Congress on December 1, 2023, after numerous scandals. Democrat Tom Suozzi won a special election to succeed him on February 13, 2024.)	Harris/ Walz (D) ✗
2025	Kathy Hochul (D)	Antonio Delgado (D)	Letitia James (D)	Thomas DiNapoli (D)	41D, 22R	103D, 47R	Kirsten Gillibrand (D)	Chuck Schumer (D)	19D, 7R	Harris/ Walz (D) ✗
2026	Kathy Hochul (D)	Antonio Delgado (D)	Letitia James (D)	Thomas DiNapoli (D)	41D, 22R	103D, 47R	Kirsten Gillibrand (D)	Chuck Schumer (D)	19D, 7R	Harris/ Walz (D) ✗
2027	Kathy Hochul (D)	Adrienne Adams (D)	Letitia James (D)	Thomas DiNapoli (D)			Kirsten Gillibrand (D)	Chuck Schumer (D)	20D, 6R	Harris/ Walz (D) ✗

Key to party colors and abbreviations for members of the U.S. Congress and other politicians or officials
Alaskan Independence (AKIP) Know Nothing (KN) American Labor (AL) Anti-Jacksonian (Anti-J); National Republican (NR) Anti-Administration (AA) Anti-Masonic (Anti-M) Conservative (Con) Covenant (Cov)	Democratic (D) Democratic–Farmer–Labor (DFL) Democratic–NPL (D-NPL) Dixiecrat (Dix), States' Rights (SR) Democratic-Republican (DR) Farmer–Labor (FL) Federalist (F); Pro-Administration (PA)	Free Soil (FS) Fusion (Fus) Greenback (GB) Independence (IPM) Jacksonian (J) Liberal (Lib) Libertarian (L) National Union (NU)	Nonpartisan League (NPL) Nullifier (N) Opposition Northern (O); Opposition Southern (O) Populist (Pop) Progressive (Prog) Prohibition (Proh) Readjuster (Rea)	Republican (R) Silver (Sv) Silver Republican (SvR) Socialist (Soc) Union (U) Unconditional Union (UU) Vermont Progressive (VP) Whig (W)	Independent (I) Nonpartisan (NP)

== See also ==
- Politics in New York
- Politics of New York (state)
- Elections in New York
- List of political parties in New York
- Political party strength in New York City
