= John Van Ness Yates =

American politician

Secretary of State of New York
- In office April 24, 1818 – February 14, 1826
- Governor: Joseph C. Yates; DeWitt Clinton
- Preceded by: Charles D. Cooper
- Succeeded by: Azariah Cutting Flagg

Personal details
- Born: December 18, 1779; Albany, New York, U.S.
- Died: January 10, 1839 (aged 59); Albany, New York, U.S.
- Political party: Democratic-Republican
- Spouse: Eliza Ross Cunningham
- Parent(s): Robert Yates; Jane Van Ness Yates

John Van Ness Yates (December 18, 1779 – January 10, 1839) was a New York lawyer, Democratic-Republican politician, and Secretary of State from 1818 to 1826.

== Early life ==
He was born in Albany on December 18, 1779. He was one of six children born to Jannette "Jane" Van Ness (1741–1818) and Robert Yates, a prominent Anti-Federalist attorney and jurist. His maternal uncle was Judge Peter Van Ness of Kinderhook and his cousins included John Peter Van Ness, William P. Van Ness, and Cornelius P. Van Ness.

== Career ==
He became a lawyer after clerking in the office of John Vernon Henry. He held a number of offices in Albany, and was one of the first trustees of the Albany United Presbyterian Church. He was a captain of a light infantry company in 1806, master in chancery in 1808, recorder of the city 1809–1816, and New York Secretary of State 1818–1826.

He co-authored History of the State of New-York: Including Its Aboriginal and Colonial Annals (1826). This book features a vision of the Erie Canal, then under construction, in a ruined state in some distant, postapocalyptic future.

== Personal life ==
Yates was married to Eliza Ross Cunningham (1789–1847), who was from Kilbarchan, Scotland. Together, they were the parents of John Van Ness Yates Jr. (1834–1837). After his death on January 10, 1839, in Albany, he was buried in Albany Rural Cemetery.

Political offices
Preceded by Charles D. Cooper	Secretary of State of New York; 1818 - 1826	Succeeded by Azariah Cutting Flagg
