= 1795 United States Senate election in New York =

- January 27, 1795
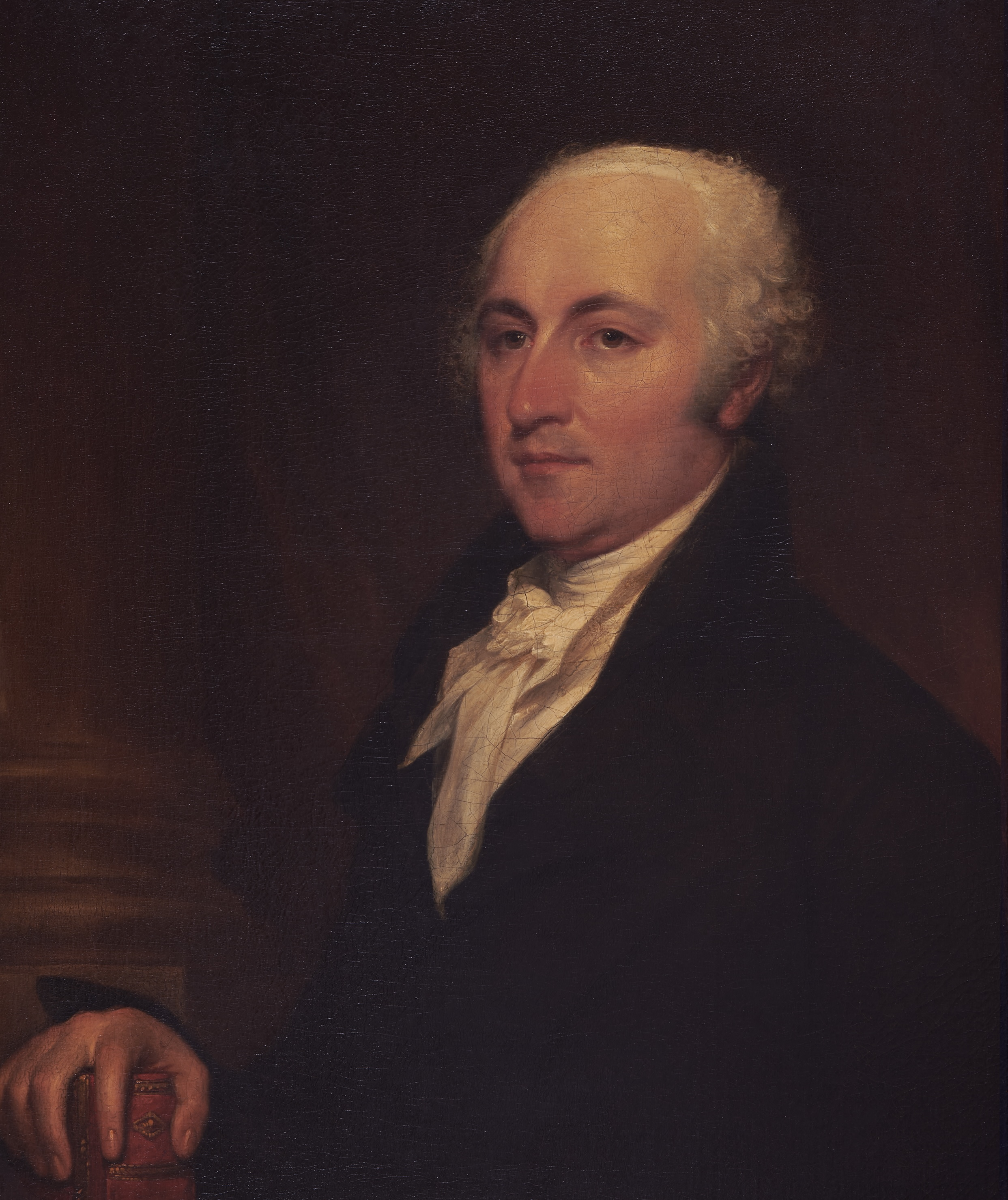

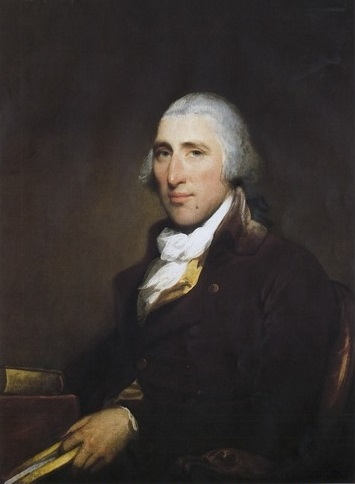
Nominee	Rufus King	Thomas Tillotson
Party	Federalist	Federalist
Electoral vote	35	30
Percentage	53.03%	45.45%
U.S. senator before election
Rufus King
Federalist
Elected U.S. Senator
Rufus King
Federalist

The 1795 United States Senate election in New York was held on January 27, 1795, by the New York State Legislature to elect a U.S. senator (Class 3) to represent the State of New York in the United States Senate.

== Background ==
In July 1789, Philip Schuyler and Rufus King had been elected to the U.S. Senate. King had drawn the long term which would expire on March 3, 1795.

At the State election in April 1794, Federalist majorities were elected to both houses of the 18th New York State Legislature which met from January 6 to 14 at Poughkeepsie, New York, and from January 20 to April 9, 1795, at New York City.

== Result ==
King's name was proposed for re-election in the Senate, and passed narrowly with 12 Yeas and 11 Nays.

In the Assembly, two alternatives were proposed: State Senator Thomas Tillotson and Judge John Lawrence.

1795 U.S. Senate election in the Assembly
Party	Candidate	Votes	%
Federalist	Rufus King	35	53.03%
Federalist	Thomas Tillotson	30	45.45%
Federalist	John Lawrence (Note: Lawrence is often spelled "Laurance," but it is spelled Lawrence in the official record of the election.)	1	1.52%
Total votes		66	100.00%

== Aftermath ==
Rufus King was appointed U.S. Minister to Great Britain, and resigned from the U.S. Senate on May 23, 1796. A special election to fill the vacancy was held in November 1796.

== Sources ==
- The New York Civil List compiled in 1858 (see: pg. 62 for U.S. Senators; pg. 115 for State Senators 1794–95; page 168f for Members of Assembly 1794–95)
- Members of the Fourth United States Congress
- History of Political Parties in the State of New-York by Jabez Delano Hammond (page 88)
