= Charles D. Cooper =

American physician, lawyer and politician (1769–1831)

Secretary of State of New York
- In office April 16, 1817 – April 24, 1818
- Governor: John Tayler (acting); DeWitt Clinton
- Preceded by: Robert L. Tillotson
- Succeeded by: John Van Ness Yates

Personal details
- Born: Charles DeKay Cooper; 1769 Rhinebeck, Dutchess County, New York
- Died: January 30, 1831 (aged 61–62)
- Spouse: Margaret Vernor Tayler
- Children: 5
- Parent(s): Ananias Cooper; Elizabeth DeKay

Charles DeKay Cooper (1769 – January 30, 1831) was an American medical doctor, lawyer and Democratic-Republican politician.

== Early life ==
Born in Rhinebeck, New York, he was the son of Dr. Ananias Cooper and Elizabeth DeKay Cooper.

He studied medicine with Dr. Crosby in New York City and became a physician, like his father. By 1791, Cooper had settled in Albany. In 1792, he began to practice medicine.

== Career ==
In 1794, he was appointed Health Officer of the Port of Albany

In February 1804, Cooper attended a dinner party during which Alexander Hamilton spoke forcefully and eloquently against the Federalists' plan to nominate Aaron Burr as their candidate for Governor of New York. Cooper later wrote a letter to Philip Schuyler, Alexander Hamilton's father-in-law, in which he made reference to the "despicable opinion" Hamilton had expressed about Burr. The letter was published in The Albany Register, but was tame compared to other attacks on Burr in the press. Still, Cooper's letter proved the last straw in the ongoing rivalry between Burr and Hamilton. When Burr read the letter weeks later, shortly after his defeat in the governor's race, he was enraged by Hamilton's alleged remarks, and challenged Hamilton to a duel, in which Hamilton was killed.

From March 1806 to June 1807, Cooper was First Judge of the Albany County Court. From 1815 to 1816, he was a member of the Erie Canal Commission. In April 1817, while his father-in-law was Acting Governor, Cooper was appointed Secretary of State of New York.

== Personal life ==
He married Margaret Vernor (c. 1774–1860), the adopted daughter of the future Lt. Gov. John Tayler and the former Margarita Van Valkenburgh. They had five children, including:

- John Tayler Cooper (1798–1878), a lawyer and Major-General who married a daughter of John Vernon Henry.
- Charles DeKay Cooper (1813–1902), a Reverend who married Cornelia Lansing Sutherland, a granddaughter of Chancellor John Lansing Jr.

=== Death and burial ===
Cooper died on January 30, 1831. He was buried in the Dutch Reformed section of the State Street Burying Grounds, but his remains were later removed to a family plot in the Albany Rural Cemetery.

== Sources ==
- Barbagallo, Tricia (March 10, 2007). "Fellow Citizens Read a Horrid Tale" (PDF). Archived from the original (PDF) on May 19, 2009.
- Charles D. Cooper on Political Graveyard
- About his letter to P. Schuyler, at PBS
- Obit of his son, spelling erroneously the name of Gov. John Tayler and confusing the names of the governor and Charles Cooper's brother John Tayler Cooper, in The New York Times on October 13, 1902 (PDF)
- Bio at NYSM
- Short bio, at Rootsweb
- Bio of Margaret Vernor, at NYSM
- Report submitted by the Canal Commission on March 8, 1816, to the State Assembly, signed by Cooper, in Niles Weekly Register (Vol. 10, March 1816, page 101)
- Cooper genealogy in A History of the County of Westchester, from Its First Settlement to the Present Time by Robert Bolton (Alexander S. Gould, 1848, Vol. 2, page 511)
- The New York Civil List compiled by Franklin Benjamin Hough (page 358; Weed, Parsons and Co., 1858)
- List of canal commissioners
- Death date from The Annals of Albany Vol. VI, by Joel Munsell (re-published by BiblioBazaar, LLC, 2008, ISBN 0-559-28203-6, ISBN 978-0-559-28203-4, page 142) {The burial ground inscription says "...in the 60th year of his age." but all sources give 1769 as birth year, which means he died in his 62nd year.]

Political offices
Preceded by Robert L. Tillotson	Secretary of State of New York; 1817–1818	Succeeded by John Van Ness Yates
