= Notary public (New York) =

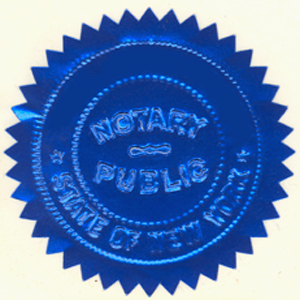
An embossed notary seal. This type of seal is no longer legally sufficient in New York State.

Notaries public in New York are commissioned by the Secretary of State of New York after passing a short examination in law and procedure and submitting an application for appointment accompanied by the proper fees. A notary's commission is received from and kept on file with the county clerk of the county in which they reside or do business, but notaries are empowered to actually perform their duties anywhere in the state.

== Requirements ==
Notaries public must be residents of the state or have an office or place of business in the state. Attorneys at law with the exception of taking and passing the initial, written notary examination, must follow the same appointment and re-appointment process as non-lawyers; lawyers are not automatically appointed as notaries because they are licensed as lawyers. Someone who is a commissioner or inspector of elections may also be a notary. County clerk employees may be appointed a notary without submitting the customary fees; however, the written examination is required. A state legislator may also be a notary, without any conflict of interest. Since the passage of the Married women's property acts in the mid-19th century, a married woman can be a notary.

Certain persons cannot be commissioned as a notary public in New York. These include a non-citizen, someone who has neither a residence nor a business in New York, a person convicted of certain felonies, a person removed from office as notary or commissioner of deeds, and a convicted draft dodger. The State Constitution prohibits (the) elected Sheriffs from holding any other office; sheriffs may not be appointed notaries. The collateral consequences of certain criminal conduct may be relieved upon the issuance of a certificate of good conduct by the parole board or an executive pardon by the governor.

== Powers ==
New York notaries are empowered to administer oaths and affirmations (including oaths of office), to take affidavits and depositions, to receive and certify acknowledgments or proofs (of execution) of deeds, mortgages and powers of attorney and other instruments in writing. Notaries may also demand acceptance or payment of foreign and inland bills of exchange, promissory notes and obligations in writing. Other powers include required attendance at the forced opening of an abandoned safe deposit box to observe the opening and conduct and provide a written inventory of the contents.

New York notaries may not issue certified copies of publicly recordable documents (i.e. birth certificate, marriage certificate, bankruptcy discharge, divorce decree, etc.); notably (as emphasized by official publications) they may not certify copies of documents (for instance, "I hereby certify that this is a true and correct copy...," is beyond the authority of a New York notary). However, a notary may issue a notarial copy certification in which the document custodian signs and swears to the authenticity of the original and facsimile document. New York notaries, including attorney-notaries, may not solemnize marriages in a civil ceremony. In New York state, a notary is not required for a testator to write or execute a last will and testament. New York law requires two witnesses, who do not need to be notaries, to attend and observe the will signing ceremony; subsequent to the execution by both testator and subscribing witnesses, these witnesses may then swear to the mental competence of the testator and other factors associated with the execution ceremony. A notary may, upon request, take a "self-proving affidavit" or an "affidavit of execution" sworn to and signed by the testator and the two (subscribing) witnesses, which will serve as formal proof and testimony of the proper will execution in the probate process at the county surrogate..

== Seal or stamp ==
New York notaries are not ordered to possess or use official marking stamps or seals of any kind. In lieu of a traditional inked stamp, New York notaries must handwrite, typewrite or print, below the official signature, the "statement of authority": commissioned name; the words "Notary Public State of New York"; the county in which they are qualified (the county in which the county clerk records a signed and sworn oath of office); commission expiration date. Most New York notaries possess and use some form of marking stamp and/or official embossing seal. It is considered a best practice, however, for a professional notary to incorporate the use of a marking inked stamp and official embossing seal.

== Appointment and reappointment ==
A notary commission is granted for a four-year term. Other than the prequalification written examination, no continuing education is required during the term. Both initial and reappointment applications require a $60.00 application fee ($40.00 for the appointment and $20.00 for filing of the oath of office). The application for reappointment is sent by US mail to every notary approximately three months prior to the term expiration. No reexamination is required if the application for reappointment is returned during the six-month grace period after the date of expiration; a twelve-month grace period extends from the date of discharge of a member of the United States military.

JANE DOE
Notary Public, State of New York
Registration No. XXXXXXXXXXX
Qualified in Albany County
Commission Expires December 31, 20XX

The customary "statement of authority" marking stamp data for placement below the signature of the official signature of a notary; however, this information may be handwritten, typed or printed beneath the signature of a notary - a stamp is not required..

Notaries may collect $2.00 to administer an oath or affirmation (but not an oath of office) and to take an acknowledgment or proof of execution. Many notaries elect to waive the fee, especially if working within the employ of a private or public employer. Each county clerk also has a notary on duty in the clerk's office to serve the public at no charge. Travel expense charged is a separate fee, unregulated by law, and is privately negotiated between the notary and client.

As of April, 2017, New York State had approximately 291,000 commissioned notaries public.

Cities in the State of New York appoint and commission an officer called a Commissioner of Deeds, which can be applied for with the respective City Clerk's office and is appointed by the City Council. These local officials possess limited powers and the acts performed by them may not be accepted in some states or international destinations.
