= Daniel Hale (politician) =

American politician (died 1821)

Daniel Hale (died September 2, 1821) was an American Federalist politician.

== Life ==
After the American Revolutionary War, he settled in Albany, New York, and became a merchant.

About 1783, he married Catharina Dyckman, and they had several children.

He was Secretary of State of New York from 1798 to 1801, and from 1810 to 1811.

Hale died in Albany on September 2, 1821.

== Sources ==
- Daniel Hale at New York State Museum
- Daniel Hale at The Political Graveyard (gives wrong year for beginning of his first term as Secretary of State)

Political offices
Preceded by Lewis Allaire Scott	Secretary of State of New York; 1798–1801	Succeeded by Thomas Tillotson
Preceded by Elisha Jenkins	Secretary of State of New York; 1810–1811	Succeeded by Elisha Jenkins
