= Secretary of State of New York =

Cabinet officer in the government of the U.S. state of New York

- Seal of the New York State Department of State

- Flag of the State of New York

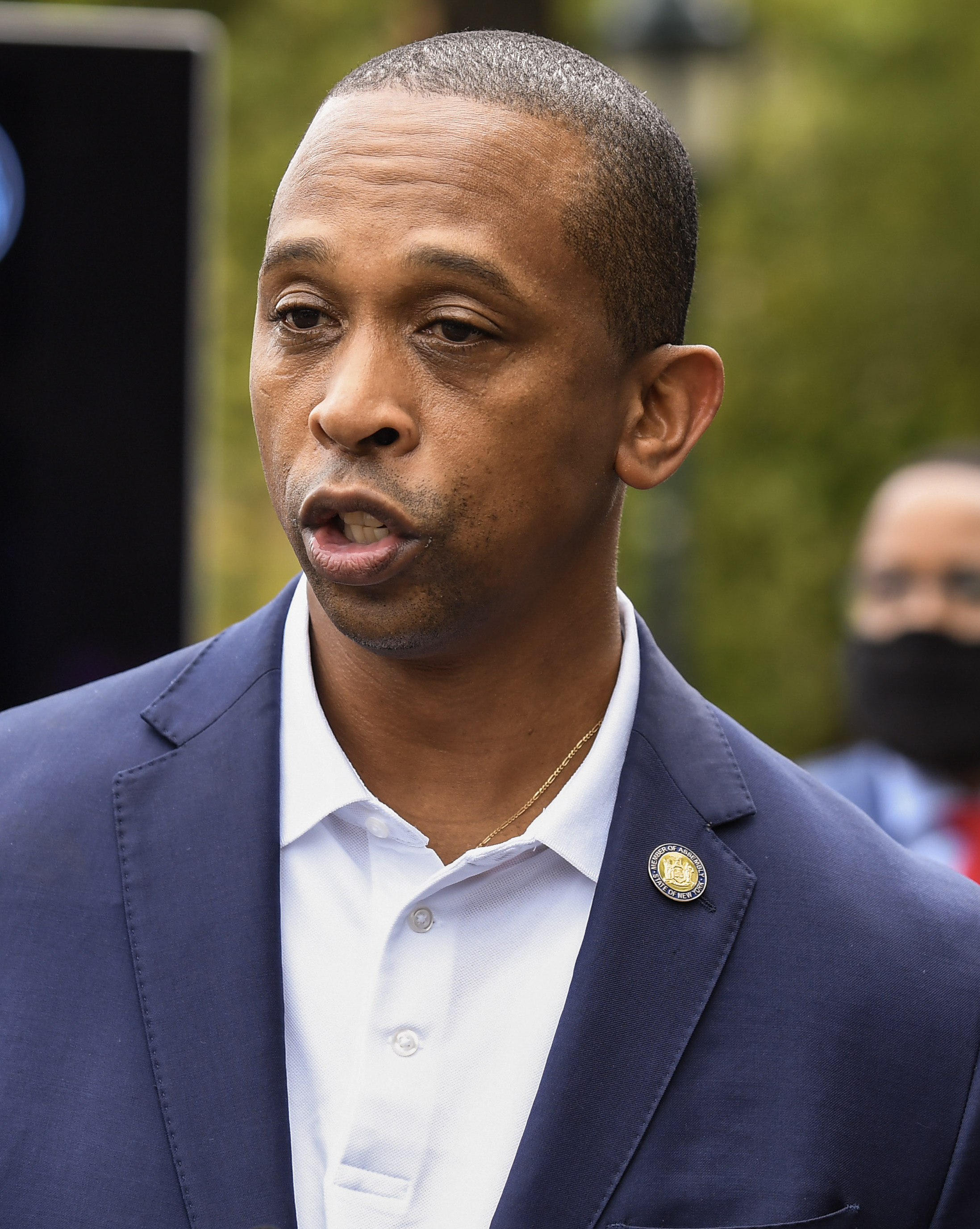
- Incumbent; Walter T. Mosley since May 22, 2024
- Department of State
- Style: The Honorable
- Inaugural holder: John Morin Scott
- Formation: 1778
- Succession: Ninth
- Salary: $120,800
- Website: dos.ny.gov

The secretary of state of New York is a cabinet officer in the government of the U.S. state of New York who leads the Department of State (NYSDOS).

The current secretary of state of New York is Walter T. Mosley, a Democrat.

== Duties ==
The secretary is responsible for regulating the licensure of a number of professions, including private investigators, cosmetologists, real estate brokers, appraisers, and notaries public. The secretary also regulates cemeteries, registers corporations and other business organizations, and maintains records of financing statements and tax liens under the Uniform Commercial Code. The New York State Athletic Commission is administratively housed within the Department of State and regulates combat sports such as boxing and professional wrestling occurring within the state.

The secretary's office includes the Office of Local Government Services, which provides training assistance to local governments in areas such as fire prevention, coastal management, and code enforcement.

The secretary of state is responsible for publishing local laws on their website and as a supplement to the Laws of New York. They are also responsible for publishing on their website a complete codification of all local laws in effect that have been adopted by the legislative body of each county.

== History ==
The office of the secretary of state of New York was established in 1778, and is one of the oldest government agencies of the state of New York.

Until 1822, the secretary of state was appointed by the Council of Appointment for an indefinite term, but could be substituted at any time, especially if the majority party in the council changed. Besides his other duties, the secretary of state was also the secretary of the Council of Appointment.

From 1823 to 1845, the secretary was elected by joint ballot of the New York State Legislature for a term of three years.

From 1847 on, the secretary and the other state cabinet officers were elected by the voters at the state elections in November in odd years to a two-year term, so that, until 1877, they served in the second half of the term of the governor in office and the first half of the term of the succeeding governor, since the governors at the time were elected to a two-year term in even years. From 1877 on, the governor served a three-year term, while the secretary continued to be elected for two years.

The secretary elected in 1895 received an additional year and served a three-year term, and from 1898 on, the secretary and other state officers were elected in even years to a two-year term at the same time as the governor, and they served concurrently.

In 1926, during the governorship of Al Smith, the state administration was reorganized, and the office became appointive and has remained so. The last secretary elected was Florence E. S. Knapp; the first appointed by the governor was Robert Moses.

On March 31, 2011, Part A of Chapter 62 of the Laws of 2011 merged the former New York State Consumer Protection Board into the Department of State creating a new Division of Consumer Protection.

== List of secretaries of state ==
#	Image	Secretary of State	Tenure	Party	Notes
1		John Morin Scott	March 13, 1778 – September 14, 1784		died in office
2		Lewis Allaire Scott	October 23, 1784 – March 17, 1798	–	son of John Morin Scott; died in office; longest-serving Secretary of State (13 years and almost 5 months)
3		Daniel Hale	March 24, 1798 – August 10, 1801	Federalist	
4		Thomas Tillotson	August 10, 1801 – March 16, 1806	Democratic-Republican	
5		Elisha Jenkins	March 16, 1806 – February 16, 1807	Democratic-Republican	
6		Thomas Tillotson	February 16, 1807 – February 1, 1808	Dem.-Rep./Lewisite	
7		Elisha Jenkins	February 1, 1808 – February 2, 1810	Dem.-Rep./Clintonian	
8		Daniel Hale	February 2, 1810 – February 1, 1811	Federalist	
9		Elisha Jenkins	February 1, 1811 – February 23, 1813	Democratic-Republican	
10		Jacob R. Van Rensselaer	February 23, 1813 – February 16, 1815	Federalist	
11		Peter Buell Porter	February 16, 1815 – February 12, 1816	Democratic-Republican	
12		Robert L. Tillotson	February 12, 1816 – April 16, 1817		son of Thomas Tillotson
13		Charles D. Cooper	April 16, 1817 – April 24, 1818	Democratic-Republican	son-in-law of Acting Governor John Tayler
14		John Van Ness Yates	April 24, 1818 – February 14, 1826	Democratic-Republican	first appointed, in 1823 re-elected by the State Legislature
15		Azariah Cutting Flagg	February 14, 1826 – January 12, 1833	Democratic-Republican	three terms; then elected New York State Comptroller
16		John Adams Dix	January 15, 1833 – February 4, 1839	Democratic	two terms
17		John Canfield Spencer	February 4, 1839 – October 11, 1841	Whig	resigned to become Secretary of War
18		Archibald Campbell (acting)	October 11, 1841 – February 7, 1842	(none)	as Deputy Secretary, acted until the election of a successor
19		Samuel Young	February 7, 1842 – February 8, 1845	Dem./Barnburner	
20		Nathaniel S. Benton	February 8, 1845 – December 31, 1847	Dem./Hunker	legislated out of office by State Constitution of 1846
21		Christopher Morgan	January 1, 1848 – December 31, 1851	Whig	first Secretary elected by general ballot; two terms
22		Henry S. Randall	January 1, 1852 – December 31, 1853	Democratic	
23		Elias W. Leavenworth	January 1, 1854 – December 31, 1855	Whig	
24		Joel T. Headley	January 1, 1856 – December 31, 1857	American	
25		Gideon J. Tucker	January 1, 1858 – December 31, 1859	Democratic	
26		David R. Floyd-Jones	January 1, 1860 – December 31, 1861	Democratic	
27		Horatio Ballard	January 1, 1862 – December 31, 1863	Union	
28		Chauncey Depew	January 1, 1864 – December 31, 1865	Union	
29		Francis C. Barlow	January 1, 1866 – December 31, 1867	Republican	
30		Homer A. Nelson	January 1, 1868 – December 31, 1871	Democratic	two terms
31		G. Hilton Scribner	January 1, 1872 – December 31, 1873	Republican	
32		Diedrich Willers, Jr.	January 1, 1874 – December 31, 1875	Democratic	
33		John Bigelow	January 1, 1876 – December 31, 1877	Democratic	
34		Allen C. Beach	January 1, 1878 – December 31, 1879	Democratic	
35		Joseph B. Carr	January 1, 1880 – December 31, 1885	Republican	three terms
36		Frederick Cook	January 1, 1886 – December 31, 1889	Democratic	two terms
37		Frank Rice	January 1, 1890 – December 31, 1893	Democratic	
38		John Palmer	January 1, 1894 – December 31, 1898	Republican	two terms (1894–1895, 1896–98)
39		John T. McDonough	January 1, 1899 – December 31, 1902	Republican	two terms
40		John F. O'Brien	January 1, 1903 – December 31, 1906	Republican	two terms
41		John S. Whalen	January 1, 1907 – December 31, 1908	Dem./Ind. L.	
42		Samuel S. Koenig	January 1, 1909 – December 31, 1910	Republican	
43		Edward Lazansky	January 1, 1911 – December 31, 1912	Democratic	
44		Mitchell May	January 1, 1913 – December 31, 1914	Democratic	
45		Francis Hugo	January 1, 1915 – December 31, 1920	Republican	three terms
46		John J. Lyons	January 1, 1921 – December 31, 1922	Republican	
47		James A. Hamilton	January 1, 1923 – December 31, 1924	Democratic	
48		Florence E. S. Knapp	January 1, 1925 – January 17, 1927	Republican	first woman in this office; the last elected Secretary of State
49		Robert Moses	January 17, 1927 – January 1, 1929	Republican	first Secretary of State appointed by the Governor
50		Edward J. Flynn	January 1, 1929 – January 17, 1939	Democratic	
51		Michael F. Walsh	January 17, 1939 – January 1, 1943	Democratic	
52		Thomas J. Curran	January 1, 1943 – January 1, 1955	Republican	
53		Carmine DeSapio	January 1, 1955 – January 1, 1959	Democratic	
54		Caroline Simon	January 1, 1959 – August 22, 1963	Republican	appointed a judge of the New York Court of Claims
55		John P. Lomenzo	August 22, 1963 – January 1, 1974	Republican	
56		John J. Ghezzi	January 1, 1974 – January 1, 1975	Republican	
57		Mario Cuomo	January 1, 1975 – December 31, 1978	Democratic	elected Lieutenant Governor
58		Basil A. Paterson	January 1, 1979 – January 1, 1983	Democratic	son David A. Paterson became Lieutenant Governor, and Governor.
59		Gail S. Shaffer	January 1, 1983 – January 4, 1995	Democratic	
60		Alexander Treadwell	January 4, 1995 – April 12, 2001	Republican	became Chairman of the Republican State Committee
61		Randy Daniels	April 12, 2001 – September 23, 2005	Republican	a Democrat when appointed, became a Republican in 2002; resigned
–		Frank Milano (acting)	September 23, 2005 – April 19, 2006	Republican	as First Deputy Secretary, acted until the appointment of a successor
62		Christopher Jacobs	April 19, 2006 – January 1, 2007	Republican	
63		Lorraine Cortés-Vázquez	January 1, 2007 – September 1, 2010	Democratic	
64		Ruth Noemí Colón	September 1, 2010 – May 2, 2011	Democratic	
65		Cesar A. Perales	May 2, 2011 – February 3, 2016	Democratic	confirmed by State Senate on June 7, 2011
66		Rossana Rosado	February 3, 2016 – November 4, 2021	Democratic	confirmed by State Senate on June 16, 2016, became Commissioner of the Department of Criminal Justice Services
–		Brendan C. Hughes (acting)	November 4, 2021 – December 9, 2021	Democratic	
67		Robert J. Rodriguez	December 9, 2021 – May 8, 2024	Democratic	confirmed by State Senate on March 2, 2022, became president and CEO of the Dormitory Authority of the State of New York
–		Brendan C. Hughes (acting)	May 8, 2024 – May 22, 2024	Democratic	
68		Walter T. Mosley	May 22, 2024 – present	Democratic	confirmed by State Senate on May 22, 2024

== See also ==
- List of company registers#United States

== Sources ==
- Google Books The Civil List of New York
