= Robert L. Tillotson =

American politician

U.S. Attorney for the Southern District of New York
- In office 1819–1828
- Preceded by: Jonathan Fisk
- Succeeded by: John Duer

Secretary of State of New York
- In office 1816–1817
- Preceded by: Peter Buell Porter
- Succeeded by: Charles D. Cooper

Personal details
- Born: Robert Livingston Tillotson; 1788
- Died: July 22, 1878 (aged 89–90) Rhinebeck, New York
- Spouse: Emily Gouverneur
- Relations: Robert R. Livingston (grandfather); Edward Livingston (uncle); Robert R. Livingston (uncle)
- Parent(s): Thomas Tillotson; Margaret Livingston

Robert Livingston Tillotson (1788 – July 22, 1878) was an American lawyer and politician.

== Early life ==
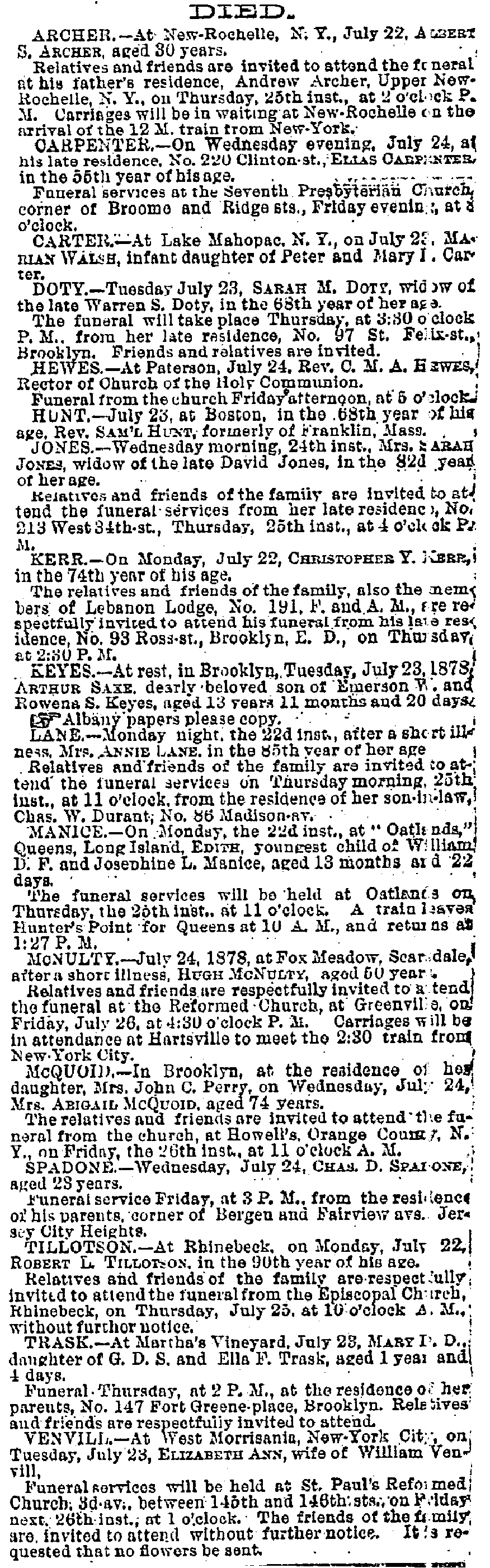
Death notice in the New York Times

He was the son of Dr. Thomas Tillotson and Margaret (née Livingston) Tillotson. Among his siblings were Janette Maria Tillotson (who married Judge James Lynch), and John C. Tillotson, who married their cousin Maria Livingston (a granddaughter of Speaker Walter Livingston). His father was Surgeon General of the Northern Department of the Continental Army during the Revolutionary War and, afterward, served as a member of the New York State Assembly, New York State Senate, U.S. House of Representatives, and Secretary of State of New York from 1807 to 1808.

His maternal grandparents were Judge Robert R. Livingston and Margaret (née Beekman) Livingston. Among his maternal family were uncles, U.S. Secretary of State Edward Livingston and Chancellor Robert R. Livingston. Through his brother John, he was uncle to the same named Robert Livingston Tillotson, who served in the Army of the Potomac during the American Civil War.

== Career ==
Tillotson served as the Judge-advocate charged with the defense of Gen. William Hull in his 1814 court-martial trial. The trial was presided over by Gen. Henry Dearborn, with future President Martin Van Buren as the special judge advocate in charge of the prosecution. Hull was convicted of cowardice and neglect of duty and was sentenced to be shot, however, President James Madison commuted the sentence to merely dismissing him from the Army in recognition of his heroic service during the Revolutionary War.

He was Secretary of State of New York from 1816 to 1817. He was U.S. Attorney for the Southern District of New York from 1819 to 1828. During his tenure, the Norwegian sloop Restoration was seized by the port authorities upon its arrival at New York, and he filed the papers in the U.S. District Court. The owners, Norwegian immigrants, got the ship released by a pardon signed by President John Quincy Adams.

From 1854 to 1857, he was a special judge in Sullivan County, New York.

== Personal life ==
On February 19, 1817, Tillotson married Emily Caroline Gouverneur (1792–1833), a daughter of Nicholas Gouverneur and Hester (née Kortright) Gouverneur. Among her siblings were Samuel L. Gouverneur (son-in-law of President James Monroe) and Maria Charlotte Gouverneur (wife of Thomas McCall Cadwalader). Together, they were the parents of:

- Howard V. Tillotson (1818–1891)
- Gouverneur Tillotson (b. 1820)
- Charles Henry Tillotson (1823–1904)
- Emily Gouverneur Tillotson (1825–1905)
- Marie Livingston Tillotson (1830–1918)
- Henry Tillotson (1830–1832)
- Gouverneur Tillotson (1832–1907)

Tillotson died on July 22, 1878 in Rhinebeck, Dutchess County, New York.

== Sources ==
- Hannings, Bud (2012), The War of 1812: A Complete Chronology with Biographies of 63 General Officers, Jefferson, NC: McFarland & Co., ISBN 978-0-7864-6385-5
- Jordan, John W. (1911). Colonial Families of Philadelphia. Vol. II. New York, NY: Lewis Publishing Company. ISBN 9785880233557.

Political offices
Preceded by Peter Buell Porter	Secretary of State of New York; 1816–1817	Succeeded by Charles D. Cooper
Legal offices
Preceded by Jonathan Fisk	U.S. Attorney for the Southern District of New York; 1819–1828	Succeeded by John Duer
