= Thomas Tillotson =

American politician

Dr. Thomas Tillotson
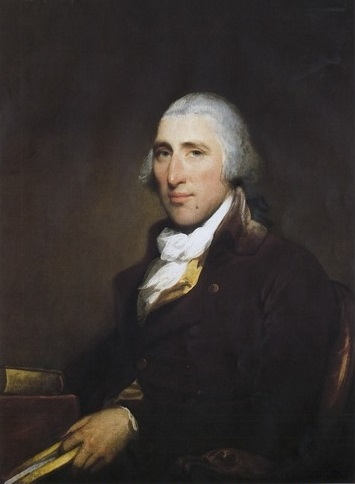
- Portrait by Gilbert Stuart, c. 1807

Secretary of State of New York
- In office February 16, 1807 – February 1, 1808
- Governor: George Clinton
- Preceded by: Elisha Jenkins
- Succeeded by: Elisha Jenkins
- In office August 10, 1801 – March 15, 1806
- Governor: George Clinton
- Preceded by: Daniel Hale
- Succeeded by: Elisha Jenkins

Member of the U.S. House of Representatives from New York's's 5th district
- In office March 4, 1801 – August 10, 1801
- Preceded by: Theodorus Bailey
- Succeeded by: Theodorus Bailey

Member of the New York Senate from the Middle District
- In office January 5, 1791 – January 27, 1800
- Preceded by: John Hathorn, Anthony Hoffman, Jacobus Swartwout, James Clinton, John Cantine, James Carpenter
- Succeeded by: Isaac Bloom, John Hathorn, John Suffern

Member of the New York Assembly from Dutchess County
- In office January 9, 1788 – December 10, 1788 Serving with Egbert Benson, Isaac Bloom, Peter Cantine, John DeWitt, Morris Graham, Matthew Patterson
- Preceded by: Dirck Brinckerhoff, John DeWitt, Lewis DuBois, Jacob Griffin, Henry Ludington, Brinton Paine, Matthew Patterson
- Succeeded by: Jonathan Akins, Samuel Barker, Isaac Bloom, John DeWitt, Jacob Griffin, Gilbert Livingston, Matthew Patterson

Personal details
- Born: c. 1751/1752 Maryland, British America
- Died: May 5, 1832 (aged 80–81) Rhinebeck, New York, U.S.
- Party: Federalist (Before 1800); Democratic-Republican (1801–1832)
- Spouse: Margaret Livingston (m. 1779; died 1832)
- Children: 5, including Robert
- Relatives: See Livingston family

Dr. Thomas Tillotson (c. 1751/1752 – May 5, 1832) was an American medical doctor and politician.

== Early life ==
Tillotson was born in the Province of Maryland around 1751 or 1752. He was the great great nephew of the Archbishop of Canterbury John Tillotson.

He received a thorough education, studied medicine, and practiced.

== Career ==
In 1776, he was commissioned as a First lieutenant in the Maryland Militia, and served during the American Revolutionary War. He was appointed by Congress as a physician and surgeon general of the Northern Department of the Continental Army in 1780, and served until the close of the war. Afterward, he settled in Rhinebeck, New York and engaged in the practice of medicine.

=== Political career ===
A Federalist, he represented Dutchess County in the New York State Assembly in 1788. In 1790, State Senator Anthony Hoffman died, and Tillotson was elected to fill the vacancy. He was a member of the State Senate from 1791 to 1799, and served as a member of the Council of Appointment in 1791. He was the runner-up in the 1795 United States Senate election in New York, losing to incumbent Rufus King by a vote in the state legislature of 35–30.

He was elected as a Democratic-Republican to the 7th United States Congress in 1800, but resigned on August 10, 1801, before Congress met, to become Secretary of State of New York. He remained in this office until March 15, 1806, and again from February 16, 1807, to February 1, 1808.

=== Linwood ===
Coat of Arms of Thomas Tillotson

Tillotson's estate in Rhinebeck was known as "Linwood". It was originally part of the Artsen-Kip Patent. Tillotson purchased from Isaac Van Etten the southerly lot forming part of the lands which had been granted in 1688 by Governor Dongan to Gerrit Aertsen and others. It was bounded on the south and west by the Hudson River and on the east by the stream known as Landsmans Kill, which also formed the westerly boundary of the Beekman patent. On this property Dr. Tillotson in the years 1788-1790 laid out a country place and called it "Linwood." His house commanded a magnificent view of the river.

He then acquired 150 acres of the Beekman land lying between Landsmans Kill and Fallsburgh Creek. This plateau, between the two streams, with extensive views of the Catskill mountains and Hudson river, became known as Linwood Hill. At the mouth of Landsmans Kill he built a dock and mill, where grain was ground. Dr. Tillotson also obtained at this time another part of the Beekman lands, twenty-nine acres of woodland lying east of Fallsburgh Creek, where two beautiful waterfalls bring it to the river level. This portion of the property became known as "Glenburn".

In 1830, Tillotson gave "Glenburn" to his granddaughter, Julia Lynch, who later married Rev. Stephen Olin, President of Wesleyan University. After Tillotson's death, "Lindon Hill" was sold to Federal Vanderburgh.

== Personal life ==
In 1779, he married Margaret Livingston (1749–1823), a daughter of Judge Robert Livingston and Margaret (née Beekman) Livingston. Among her siblings were U.S. Secretary of State Edward Livingston and Chancellor Robert R. Livingston. Their children included:

- Janette Maria Tillotson (1786–1866), who married Judge James Lynch.
- Robert Livingston Tillotson (1788–1878), who married Emily Gouverneur, a daughter of Nicholas Gouverneur and Hester (née Kortright) Gouverneur. Among her siblings were Samuel L. Gouverneur (son-in-law of President James Monroe) and Maria Charlotte Gouverneur (wife of Thomas McCall Cadwalader).
- Caroline Amelia Tillotson (b. 1789), who died young.
- John C. Tillotson (1791–1867), who married Maria Livingston, a daughter of Robert L. Livingston (son of Speaker Walter Livingston) and Margaret Maria Livingston (youngest daughter of Chancellor Robert R. Livingston).
- Howard Tillotson (1792–1813), a member of the U.S. Navy; he died, unmarried, at sea.

He died in Rhinebeck on May 5, 1832, was buried in the Livingston family vault in the cemetery at the Dutch Reformed Church in Rhinebeck.

== Sources ==
=== Books ===
- Year Book of the Dutchess County Historical Society. Vol. 13. Poughkeepsie, NY: Dutchess County Historical Society. 1928.
- Hamilton, Alexander (1965). The Papers of Alexander Hamilton. Vol. 9. New York, NY: Columbia University Press. ISBN 9780231089074.
- Jefferson, Thomas (2008). The Papers of Thomas Jefferson. Vol. 35. Princeton, NJ: Princeton University Press. ISBN 978-0-691-13773-5.
- Jordan, John W. (1911). Colonial Families of Philadelphia. Vol. II. New York, NY: Lewis Publishing Company. ISBN 9785880233557.

=== Internet ===
- "Pension Application for Thomas Tillotson" (PDF). revwarny.com. St. Johnsville, NY: Revolutionary War in NY State.
- Hermans, Sarah K. (May 1, 2005). "Patriots of the American Revolution Interred in the Rhinebeck Reformed Church Cemetery" (PDF). NorthernDutchessDAR.org. Chancellor Livingston Chapter, National Society of Daughters of the American Revolution.

== See also ==
- List of United States representatives-elect who never took their seats

U.S. House of Representatives
Preceded by Theodorus Bailey	Member of the U.S. House of Representatives from New York's 5th congressional district 1801	Succeeded by Theodorus Bailey
Political offices
Preceded by Daniel Hale	Secretary of State of New York; 1801–1806	Succeeded by Elisha Jenkins
Preceded by Elisha Jenkins	Secretary of State of New York; 1807–1808	Succeeded by Elisha Jenkins
