= Elisha Jenkins =

American politician

Elisha Jenkins

Elisha Jenkins (1772 – May 18, 1849) was an American politician who served as New York Secretary of State and Mayor of Albany.

== Life ==
He was born to a Providence, Rhode Island, Quaker family, who in 1784 came to settle at Hudson, New York. He later lived in Albany, New York, and was one of the first prominent Quakers there. Throughout his adult life, he was a dry goods merchant in the partnerships of Wendell & Jenkins and Thomas Jenkins & Sons. In 1792, he married Catherine Green (ca. 1771–1835), of Providence, R.I. After her death he married his second wife, Hannah.

He was a Federalist member of the New York State Assembly from Columbia County in 1795 and 1798, but changed sides in 1798 when his close political friend Ambrose Spencer joined the Democratic-Republicans.

Jenkins was Columbia County Treasurer from 1798 to 1802, and New York State Comptroller from 1801 to 1806. He was New York Secretary of State from 1806 to 1807, from 1808 to 1810, and from 1811 to 1813. In April 1807, after his first term as Secretary of State, Jenkins was attacked in the street in Albany by Solomon Van Rensselaer, a Federalist of whom Jenkins was a fierce critic. Jenkins sued for damages, and was awarded $2,500. He served as Quartermaster General of the Northern Department during the War of 1812, Mayor of Albany from 1816 to 1819, and presidential elector in 1840. He was twice a candidate for Congress: in the 6th congressional district in 1798, and in the 9th congressional district in 1816.

He died on May 18, 1849, in New York City.

== Sources ==
- Barbagallo, Tricia (March 10, 2007). "Fellow Citizens Read a Horrid Tale" (PDF). Archived from the original (PDF) on 2009-05-19.
- Bielinski, Stefan (March 10, 2007). "Elisha Jenkins".
- Entry at Long Island Genealogy
- The Columbia County Civil List
- Jenkins Genealogy, at Kindred Konnections
- Essay with an account of Van Rensselaer's attack

Political offices
Preceded by John Vernon Henry	New York State Comptroller; 1801–1806	Succeeded by Archibald McIntyre
Preceded by Thomas Tillotson	Secretary of State of New York; 1806–1807	Succeeded by Thomas Tillotson
Preceded by Thomas Tillotson	Secretary of State of New York; 1808–1810	Succeeded by Daniel Hale
Preceded by Daniel Hale	Secretary of State of New York; 1811–1813	Succeeded by Jacob R. Van Rensselaer
