= Florence E. S. Knapp =

American politician (1875–1949)

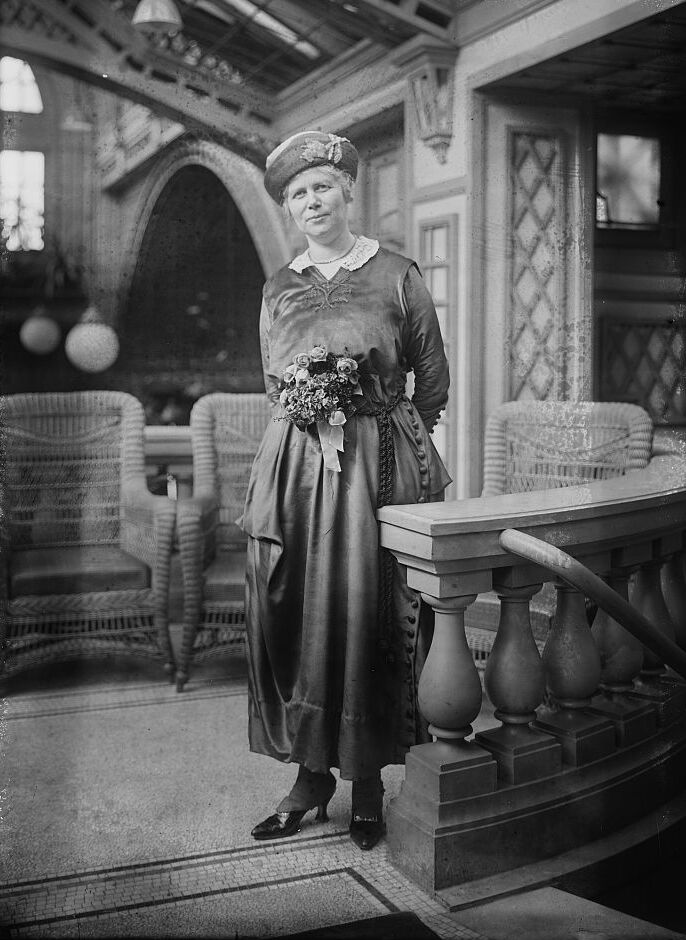
- Florence E. S. Knapp in 1920

48th Secretary of State of New York
- In office January 1, 1925 – January 17, 1927
- Governor: Al Smith
- Preceded by: James A. Hamilton
- Succeeded by: Robert Moses

Personal details
- Born: March 25, 1875 Syracuse, New York
- Died: October 27, 1949 (aged 74) Marcy, New York
- Party: Republican
- Spouse: Philip Schuyler Knapp

Florence Elizabeth Smith Knapp (March 25, 1875 – October 26, 1949) was an American politician who was the first woman elected to a state cabinet office in New York state.

== Biography ==
She was born on March 25, 1875, in Syracuse, New York, as Florence Elizabeth Smith. She was a descendant of Ebenezer Hancock, who was the librarian of Harvard University and brother of John Hancock.

She married Philip Schuyler Knapp (died 1913).

In 1920, Syracuse University awarded Florence an honorary degree of Bachelor of Science in education. She was a delegate to the 1920 Republican National Convention and an alternate delegate to the 1924 Republican National Convention.

She was the secretary of state of New York from 1925 to 1927, elected in 1924. After leaving office, she was accused of maladministration, leading her to resign as dean of the College of Home Economics at Syracuse University. In June 1928, she was convicted of grand larceny in office. During the taking of New York's 1925 census, Knapp had put her stepdaughter's name on the payroll, took the stepdaughter's checks, forged the endorsements and spent the money on clothes.

Knapp died on October 26, 1949, at the Marcy State Hospital in Marcy, New York.

== Legacy ==
She was New York’s last elected secretary of state. The role became an appointed position after a reorganization of state administration under Governor Al Smith.

Knapp remained the only woman elected to a statewide office in New York for fifty years, until the election of Mary Anne Krupsak as lieutenant governor in 1974.

Party political offices
Preceded by Samuel J. Joseph	Republican nominee for Secretary of State of New York; 1924	Succeeded by None
Political offices
Preceded by James A. Hamilton	Secretary of State of New York; 1925–1927	Succeeded by Robert Moses
