= John Vernon Henry =

American politician

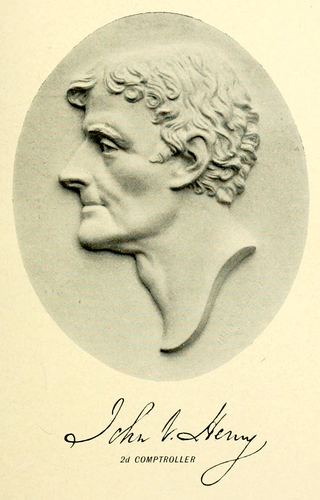
John V. Henry

John Vernon (or Vernor) Henry (1767 – October 22, 1829) was an American lawyer and politician.

== Life ==
John V. Henry was born in 1767, the son of Robert and Elizabeth Vernor Henry. He was admitted to the bar in 1782. He was a Federalist member of the New York State Assembly from Albany County from 1800 to 1802. He was New York State Comptroller from 1800 to 1801. He was a delegate to the New York State Constitutional Convention of 1801.

John V. Henry was married to Charlotte Seaton (or Seton), whose sister was married to his brother, Robert R. He died of apoplexy in 1829, and was buried at the Albany Rural Cemetery in Menands, New York.

== Sources ==
- Political Graveyard
- Google Books The New York Civil List compiled by Franklin Benjamin Hough (page 34; Weed, Parsons and Co., 1858)
- Notable people's bios, at Albany Rural Cemetery

Political offices
Preceded by Samuel Jones	New York State Comptroller; 1800–1801	Succeeded by Elisha Jenkins
