= 1893 New York state election =

- November 7, 1893

The 1893 New York state election was held on November 7, 1893, to elect the Secretary of State, the State Comptroller, the Attorney General, the State Treasurer, the State Engineer and a judge of the New York Court of Appeals, as well as all members of the New York State Assembly and the New York State Senate, and delegates to the New York State Constitutional Convention of 1894.

== History ==
The People's state convention met on August 18 and 19 at Sylvan Beach, New York. I. E. Dean was Permanent Chairman. James Wright was nominated for Secretary of State on the first ballot (vote: Wright 31, John Taft 28). De Myre S. Fero, of Glens Falls, was nominated for Comptroller on the first ballot (vote: Fero 47, E. P. Nevins 5). Frank H. Purdy, of Bluff Point, was nominated for Treasurer by acclamation. Thaddeus B. Wakeman, of New York City, was nominated for Attorney General; Lawrence J. McParlin for the Court of Appeals; and John A. Webster, of New York City, for State Engineer.

The Prohibition state convention met on August 30 at Elmira, New York. Joseph A. Bogardus was chairman. They nominated Joseph A. Bogardus, of New York City, for Secretary of State; George Chester, of Buffalo, for Comptroller; William R. Hunt of Honeoye Falls, for Treasurer; Edwin C. English, of Corning, for Attorney General; Silas W. Mason for the Court of Appeals; and Chester Belding of Middletown, for State Engineer.

The Democratic state convention met on October 5 and 6 at Saratoga Springs, New York. Daniel N. Lockwood presided. Cord Meyer Jr., for Secretary of State Comptroller Frank Campbell, Attorney General Simon W. Rosendale, Hugh Duffy for Treasurer, and State Engineer Martin Schenck, were nominated by acclamation. The incumbent Isaac H. Maynard was nominated for the Court of Appeals after Robert Weidenmann, of Rockland County, spoke out loud against this nomination, and asked for a roll call. Weidenmann however was the only one who voted against Maynard's nomination. The ticket had been published already before the convention met, showing a strong party machine. The electorate however had still in mind the electoral fraud of the Dutchess County senatorial election in 1891 which went through the courts and involved the Democratic state officers; Judge Maynards subtraction of the letter containing the corrected statement, sent by the Dutchess County Clerk to Albany, which action showed him as "cheap political trickster" and made him a "disgrace to the bench"; and Treasurer Danforth's and Ex-Treasurer Fitzgerald's connection with the bankrupt Madison Square Bank in which Danforth had deposited State funds and which had given Danforth a "loan" of about seven years Treasurer's salary but closed its doors in August 1893.

The Republican state convention met on October 6 at Syracuse, New York. Mr. Cullinen was Temporary Chairman until the choice of Judge Frank Brundage, of Onondaga County, as Permanent Chairman. Edward T. Bartlett was nominated for the Court of Appeals on the first ballot (vote: Bartlett 531½, William Rumsey 98, John Sabine Smith 80). John Palmer for Secretary of State, and James A. Roberts for Comptroller, were nominated by acclamation. Addison B. Colvin was nominated for treasurer on the first ballot (vote: Colvin 392, Thomas H. O'Neill 175, Richmond 107). Theodore E. Hancock was nominated for attorney general during the second ballot (first ballot: John Woodward 332, Hancock 246½, Gilbert E. D. Hasbrouck 124). Campbell W. Adams was nominated for state engineer by acclamation amid great noise and after two thirds of the delegates had left.;

== Results ==
Dragged down by Judge Maynard, the Democratic ticket was defeated, ending a ten-year supremacy which began with the election of Grover Cleveland in 1884. The Republican ticket was elected, beginning a Republican era of thirteen years in New York state politics.

The incumbents Campbell, Rosendale, Schenck and Maynard were defeated.

1893 state election results
| Office | Republican ticket | | Democratic ticket | | Prohibition ticket | | Socialist Labor ticket | | People's ticket | |
|---|---|---|---|---|---|---|---|---|---|---|
| Secretary of State | John Palmer | 545,098 | Cord Meyer Jr. | 520,614 | Joseph A. Bogardus | 34,301 | Daniel De Leon | 20,034 | James Wright | 17,049 |
| Comptroller | James A. Roberts | 545,997 | Frank Campbell | 520,667 | George Chester | 33,411 | James Withers | 19,850 | De Myre S. Fero | 16,959 |
| Attorney General | Theodore E. Hancock | 543,067 | Simon W. Rosendale | 521,777 | Edwin C. English | 34,098 | Frederick Bennets | 19,727 | Thaddeus B. Wakeman | 17,107 |
| Treasurer | Addison B. Colvin | 544,930 | Hugh Duffy | 520,158 | William R. Hunt | 34,252 | William F. Steer | 19,754 | Frank H. Purdy | 17,123 |
| State Engineer | Campbell W. Adams | 545,147 | Martin Schenck | 520,661 | Chester Belding | 34,009 | Charles F. Wilson | 19,912 | John A. Webster | 17,109 |
| Judge of the Court of Appeals | Edward T. Bartlett | 579,222 | Isaac H. Maynard | 478,158 | Silas W. Mason | 32,548 | Francis Gerau | 19,659 | Lawrence J. McParlin | 16,791 |

Obs.: "Defective, blank and scattering" votes: 10,860 (Judge); 3,642 (Attorney); 3,481 (Treasurer); 3,305 (Secretary); 3,087 (Engineer); 2,990 (Comptroller)

== See also ==
- New York state elections

== Sources ==
- The Democratic and Republican candidates: CANDIDATES OF THE PARTIES in NYT on November 5, 1893
- Result: OFFICIAL CANVASS OF THE VOTE in NYT on December 14, 1893
- Result: The Tribune Almanac 1894
- Result in New York City: OFFICIAL VOTE IN THIS CITY in NYT on November 28, 1893
