= 1895 New York state election =

1886 New York state election
- November 5, 1895

The 1895 New York state election was held on November 5, 1895, to elect the Secretary of State, the State Comptroller, the Attorney General, the State Treasurer, the State Engineer and a judge of the New York Court of Appeals, as well as all members of the New York State Assembly and the New York State Senate. Besides, the voters were asked if they approved of the State's issuing bonds for $9,000,000.00 to spend on canal improvements, which the electorate answered in the affirmative.

== History ==
The Socialist Labor state convention met on July 6 at Troy, New York, and nominated Erasmus Pellenz, of Syracuse, for Secretary of State; Patrick Murphy, of New York City, for Comptroller; William F. Steer, of Albany, for Treasurer; Morris Berman, of Monroe County, for State Engineer; John H. Moore, of Staten Island, for Attorney General; and Henry Gray, of Westchester County, for the Court of Appeals.

The Republican state convention met on September 17 at Saratoga Springs, New York. The incumbent state officers, elected in 1893, were re-nominated, and Celora E. Martin was nominated for the Court of Appeals.

The Democratic state convention met on September 24 and 25 at Syracuse, New York. Perry Belmont was Tempoarary Chairman until the choice of Ex-Governor Roswell P. Flower (in office 1892–1894) as Permanent Chairman. John D. Teller for the Court of Appeals, and Horatio C. King for Secretary of State, were nominated by acclamation. John B. Judson was nominated for Comptroller on the first ballot (vote: Judson 311, John E. Ashe 99). Norton Chase for Attorney General, and De Witt C. Dow for Treasurer, were nominated by acclamation. Russell R. Stuart was nominated for State Engineer during the first ballot.

Lawrence J. McParlin was nominated by the People's Party for Attorney General, but declined to run. He ran instead for Surrogate of Niagara County.

== Results ==
The whole Republican ticket was elected. This was one of the very rare occasions when all incumbent state cabinet officers were re-nominated and re-elected.

The incumbents Palmer, Roberts, Hancock, Colvin and Adams were re-elected.

1895 state election results
Office	Republican ticket		Democratic ticket		Prohibition ticket		Socialist Labor ticket		People's ticket	
Secretary of State	John Palmer	601,205	Horatio C. King	511,060	William W. Smith	25,239	Erasmus Pellenz	21,497	Thaddeus B. Wakeman	6,916
Comptroller	James A. Roberts	603,125	John B. Judson	508,832	Frederick B. Devendorf	24,857	Patrick Murphy	21,504	David Rousseau	6,740
Attorney General	Theodore E. Hancock	603,358	Norton Chase	508,600	Elias Root	31,416	John H. Moore	21,212	(none)	
Treasurer	Addison B. Colvin	601,418	De Witt C. Dow	510,165	William R. Rathbun	24,906	William F. Steer	21,220	Herbert L. Case	6,666
State Engineer	Campbell W. Adams	598,676	Russell R. Stuart	512,735	Walter A. Miles	24,862	Morris Berman	21,397	Elias H. Borden	6,747
Judge of the Court of Appeals	Celora E. Martin	600,925	John D. Teller	510,005	Edwin C. English	24,794	Henry Gray	21,346	Charles Ward	6,863

Obs.: "Defective, blank and scattering" votes: 19,618 (Comptroller); 19,536 (Secretary)

Due to the adoption of the new State Constitution in 1894, the state officers and state senators were elected for an exceptional three-year term to serve 1896 to 1898, so that from 1898 on the Governor, the state officers and the state senators would be elected at the same time and serve concurrently a two-year term. Thus, this was the last regular election of state officers in an odd-numbered year. Until 1938, in odd-numbered years only the members of the New York State Assembly (which continued to serve a one-year term) were elected, and vacancies were filled, including the judgeships of the New York Court of Appeals which did not occur regularly but depended on the birth year of the incumbents (if age-limited), the year when elected (if the term expired), deaths in office, or resignations.

== See also ==
- New York state elections

== Sources ==
- The tickets: STATE ELECTIONS NOV. 5 in NYT on October 28, 1895
- The Republican candidates: STATE OFFICERS ELECTED; Sketches of Republicans Who Were Victorious in New-York in NYT on November 6, 1895
- The Democratic candidates: SKETCHES OF THE CANDIDATES in NYT on September 26, 1895
- Result in Westchester County: CORRECT VOTE OF WESTCHESTER in NYT on November 8, 1895
- Result in New York City: VOTE AT LAST ELECTION in NYT on November 26, 1895
- Result for Secretary of State and Comptroller, with estimated number in Kings County: THE TOTAL VOTE OF NEW YORK STATE in NYT on December 6, 1895
- Result: The Tribune Almanac 1896
- Vote totals from The New York Red Book 1896
