= Ira M. Hedges =

American businessman and politician

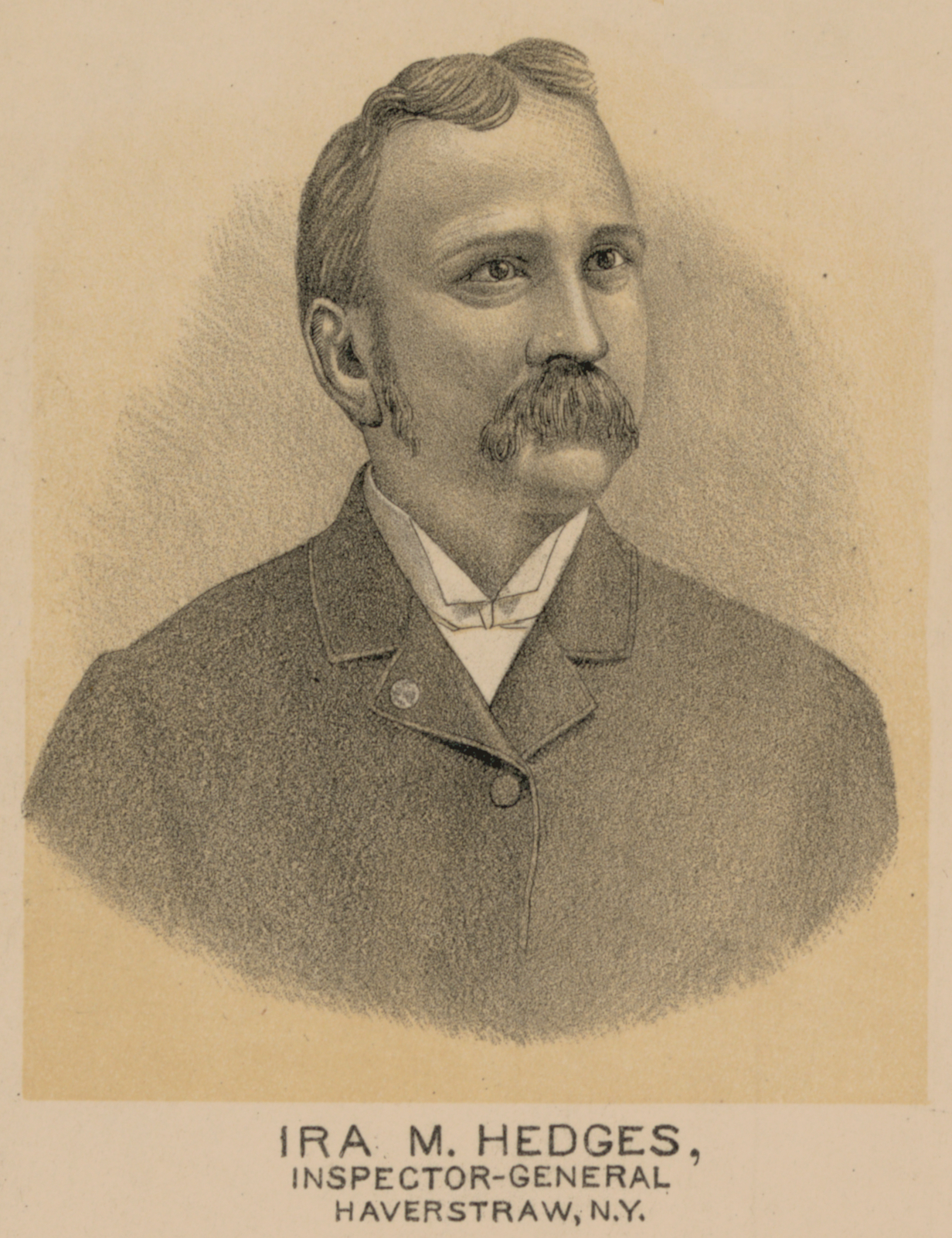

Ira Munn Hedges (July 31, 1839 – April 9, 1902) was an American businessman and politician from New York.

== Life ==
Hedges was born on July 31, 1839, in Grassy Point, New York. He was the son of Phineas Hedges and Eliza Edwards. He attended Haverstraw Mountain Institute, and was studying law under Rockland County Judge Edward Pye when the American Civil War broke out.

Hedges enlisted in October 1861, becoming a private in the 95th New York Volunteer Infantry, Company F. He was promoted to corporal in February 1862, followed by quartermaster sergeant in December 1863. He was discharged in November 1864. His company was originally raised by Judge Pye, who later became colonel of the 95th but died in the Battle of Cold Harbor. Hedges refused three commission offers, including as major for the United States Colored Troops. He served as acting ordnance sergeant in the Battle of Antietam. While in the hospital with typhoid fever, he was captured by General J. E. B. Stuart near Chambersburg. He was later paroled.

After the War, he returned to work on his father's farm. After a single season, he moved to Haverstraw and began working in the lumber and coal business. In 1870, he worked in brick manufacturing, eventually incorporating the Diamond Brick Company and serving as its president. In 1871, he helped organized the National Bank of Haverstraw and was made a director, vice-president, and later president. He was treasurer of the Haverstraw Barge and Towing Company. He also organized the North River and New York Steamboat Company, and was treasurer and president of the Crystal Salt Company.

In the 1889 New York state election, he was the Republican nominee for New York State Treasurer. He lost the election to Elliott Danforth. He ran for Treasurer again in the 1891 New York state election, only to again lose to Danforth. He was a delegate to the 1894 New York State Constitutional Convention. In 1895, he was appointed Capital Commissioner, to supervise the construction of the New York State Capitol.

Hedges was the Grand Army of the Republic's Commander of the Department of New York and Inspector-General of the national organization. He was also vice-president of the Society of the Army of the Potomac and founder of the Haverstraw post of the Sons of Union Veterans of the Civil War. He was a member of the American Scenic and Historic Preservation Society. He married Jeanette S. Knapp in 1866. Their three daughters were Margaret, Irene, and Lila.

Hedges died at home on April 9, 1902 from Bright's Disease. He was buried in the Mount Repose Cemetery in Haverstraw.
