= 1891 New York state election =

1891 New York gubernatorial election
- November 3, 1891
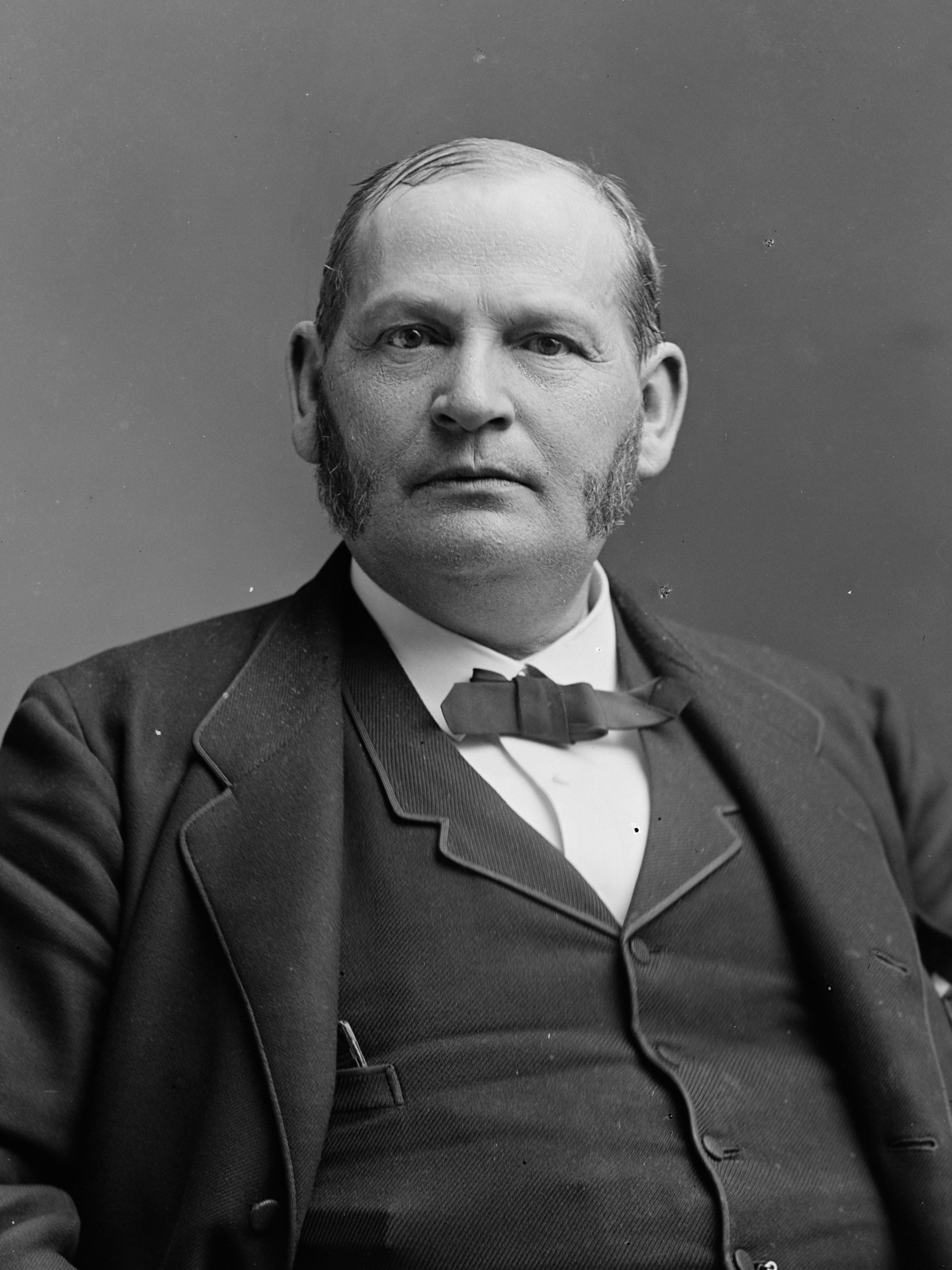

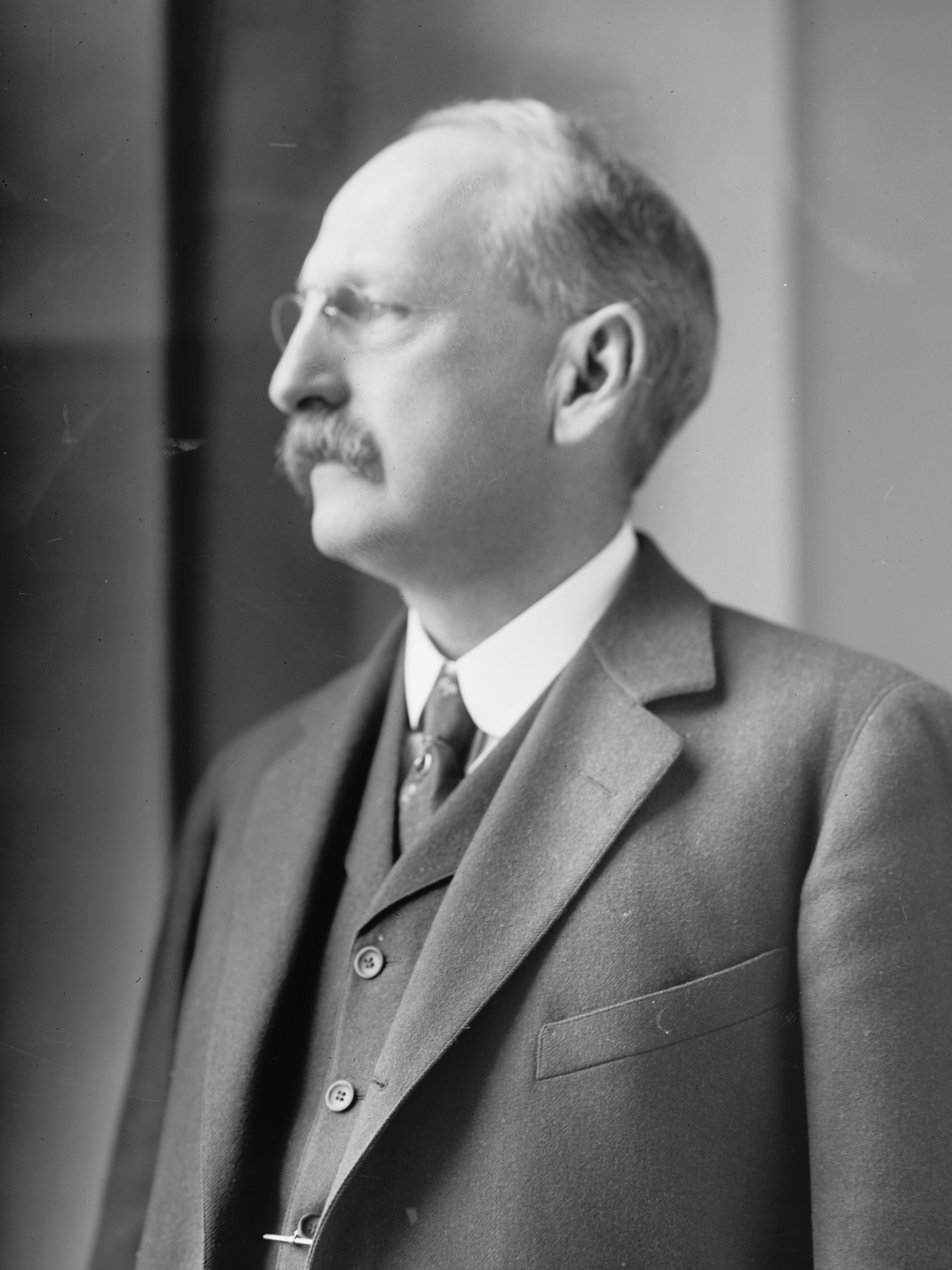
Nominee	Roswell P. Flower	Jacob Sloat Fassett
Party	Democratic	Republican
Popular vote	582,893	534,956
Percentage	50.13%	46.00%
- County results Flower: 40–50% 50–60% 60–70% Fassett: 40–50% 50–60% 60–70% No Data
Governor before election
David B. Hill
Democratic
Elected Governor
Roswell Flower
Democratic

The 1891 New York state election was held on November 3, 1891, to elect the governor, the lieutenant governor, the secretary of state, the state comptroller, the attorney general, the state treasurer and the state engineer, as well as all members of the New York State Assembly and the New York State Senate. The election was a sweep for the Democratic Party ticket.

== Party Conventions ==
=== Democratic Party ===
The Democratic state convention met on September 15 and 16 at Saratoga Springs, New York. George Raines was temporary and permanent chairman. Roswell P. Flower was nominated for governor on the first ballot (vote: Flower 334, Alfred C. Chapin 43). William F. Sheehan for lieutenant governor, Secretary of State Frank Rice, Frank Campbell for comptroller, Treasurer Elliott Danforth, Simon W. Rosendale for attorney general and Martin Schenck for state engineer, were nominated by acclamation.

=== Republican Party ===
The Republican state convention met on September 9 at Rochester, New York. W. W. Goodrich was temporary chairman until the choice of James M. Varnum as permanent chairman. Jacob S. Fassett was nominated for governor on the first ballot (vote: Fassett 514, James W. Wadsworth 85, Stewart L. Woodford 83, Philip Becker 52, Joseph B. Carr 33, Andrew D. White 1). John W. Vrooman for lieutenant governor; Eugene F. O'Connor, of Brooklyn, for secretary of state; Arthur C. Wade, of Jamestown, for comptroller; Ira M. Hedges for treasurer; William A. Sutherland, of Rochester for attorney general; and Verplanck Colvin for state engineer, were nominated by acclamation.

=== Socialist Labor Party ===
The Socialist Labor state convention met on May 18 in Albany, New York, and nominated Daniel De Leon for governor; Frank Gesser, of Utica, for lieutenant governor; Frederick Bennets for secretary of state; James Withers, of Brooklyn, for treasurer; Henry Vitalius, of Troy, for comptroller; H. G. Wilshire, of New York City, for attorney general; and Charles Wilson, of New York City, for state engineer.

=== Prohibition Party ===
The Prohibition state convention met on September 2 and 3 at Albany, New York. Henry Clay Bascom was temporary chairman. They nominated Joseph W. Bruce for governor; George W. Hallock for lieutenant governor; William E. Booth, of Geneseo, for secretary of state; Francis Crawford, of Mount Vernon, for treasurer; William W. Smith for comptroller; Henry P. Forbes, of St. Lawrence County, for state engineer; and Calvin S. Grosser, of Buffalo, for attorney general.

== Results ==
The whole Democratic ticket was elected.

The incumbents Rice and Danforth were re-elected.

Attorney General Simon W. Rosendale was the first Jew elected to a state office in New York.

1891 state election results
Office	Democratic ticket		Republican ticket		Prohibition ticket		Socialist Labor ticket	
Governor	Roswell P. Flower	582,893	Jacob S. Fassett	534,956	Joseph W. Bruce	30,353	Daniel De Leon	14,651
Lieutenant Governor	William F. Sheehan	575,012	John W. Vrooman	540,593	George W. Hallock	31,064	Frank Gesser	14,641
Secretary of State	Frank Rice	576,970	Eugene F. O'Connor	538,797	William E. Booth	31,578	Frederick Bennetts	14,684
Comptroller	Frank Campbell	581,110	Arthur C. Wade	535,804	William W. Smith	31,520	Henry Vitalius	14,706
Attorney General	Simon W. Rosendale	580,185	William A. Sutherland	535,205	Calvin S. Crosser	31,465	Henry G. Wilshire	14,536
Treasurer	Elliott Danforth	579,630	Ira M. Hedges	536,348	Francis Crawford	31,490	James Withers	14,824
State Engineer	Martin Schenck	580,337	Verplanck Colvin	538,421	Henry P. Forbes	31,492	Charles F. Wilson	14,755

== See also ==
- New York gubernatorial elections

== Sources ==
- Results in New York Red Book (1892; see pg. 480 for Governor; pg. 481 for Lieutenant Governor; pg. 482 for Secretary of State; and pg. 483 for Comptroller, Treasurer, Attorney General and Engineer)
- Result: The Tribune Almanac 1892
- Result in New York City: As Declared by the Aldermen.; The Official Statement of the Vote of the County of New-York in The New York Times on November 21, 1891
- The Republican candidates: The Candidates in The New York Times on September 10, 1891
