= Arthur C. Wade =

American lawyer and politician

Arthur C. Wade (December 12, 1852 – August 21, 1914) was an American lawyer and politician from New York.

== Life ==
Wade was born in Charlotte, New York on December 12, 1852. His parents were farmer George L. Wade and Jane E. Pearson.

After he finished school, he worked at a saw mill where he lost his left arm in an accident. He then attended Ellington Academy and the Chamberlain Institute in Randolph. Afterwards, he read law under Theodore M. Case of Ellington for 18 months. He entered Albany Law School in 1876, graduating with a law degree and getting admitted to the state bar in 1877.

After he passed the bar, he practiced law in Ellington as a law partner with Case. In 1883, he ended the partnership and moved to Jamestown, where he worked in the law office of Judge Orsell Cook. Among his most notable moments in courts was his defense of Howard C. Benham of Batavia, accused of murdering his wife. Benham was already found guilty and sentenced to death when Wade asked for a new trial, which was granted. In 1898, after a four-week trial, Wade successfully had the sentence overturned and Benham found not guilty.

Wade was also involved in a number of manufacturing and transportation companies. He was president of the Fenton Metallic Mfg. Co., the Jamestown Felt Mills, the Ulster Oil Co., and the United States Voting Machine Co. He was also secretary of the Waverly, Sayre, & Athens Traction Co., and secretary and treasurer of Chautauqua Steamboat Co. He also served as president of the Art Metal Construction Co., the Jamestown Metal Furnishing Company, the Ahlstrom Piano Company, D. H. Grandin Milling Company, Chautauqua Towel Mills, and Home Telephone Company, as well as vice-president of the Post Publishing Company, and director of the First National Bank of Jamestown and the Allen Square Company.

In the 1891 New York State election, Wade was the Republican candidate for New York State Comptroller, but lost the election to Frank Campbell. In 1903, Wade was elected to the New York State Assembly, representing the Chautauqua County 1st District. He served in the Assembly in 1904, 1905, and 1906.

Wade was a member of the Benevolent and Protective Order of Elks. His wife was Frances Briggs. They had no surviving children.

Wade died at home on August 21, 1914. He was buried in Lake View Cemetery

New York State Assembly
Preceded by J. Samuel Fowler	New York State Assembly; Chautauqua County, 1st District; 1904-1906	Succeeded by Augustus Franklin Allen
