= 1889 New York state election =

1888 New York state election
- November 5, 1889

The 1889 New York state election was held on November 5, 1889, to elect the Secretary of State, the State Comptroller, the Attorney General, the State Treasurer, the State Engineer and a judge of the New York Court of Appeals, as well as all members of the New York State Assembly and the New York State Senate.

== History ==
The Prohibition state convention met on September 4 and 5 at Shakespeare Hall in Syracuse, New York. Prof. Alphonso A. Hopkins presided. Jesse H. Griffen, a Quaker of Yorktown, was nominated for Secretary of State; Joseph W. Bruce for Treasurer; Benjamin L. Rand, a 30-year-old banker of Tonawanda, for Treasurer; Alpheus B. Kenyon, a professor of Alfred University, for State Engineer; and Coleridge A. Hart, a 35-year-old lawyer of New York City, for Attorney General; and Walter Farrington for the Court of Appeals.

The Republican state convention met on September 25 at Saratoga Springs, New York, and nominated John I. Gilbert, of Franklin County, for Secretary of State; Martin W. Cooke, of Monroe County, for Comptroller; Ira M. Hedges, of Rockland County, for Attorney General; James M. Varnum, of New York City, for Treasurer; William V. Van Rensselaer for State Engineer; and Albert Haight for the Court of Appeals.

The Democratic state convention met on October 1 at the Alhambra in Syracuse, New York. Lt. Gov. Edward F. Jones was Temporary and Permanent Chairman. Frank Rice was nominated for Secretary of State by acclamation. Comptroller Edward Wemple was re-nominated on the first ballot (vote: Wemple 265, Edward A. Maher 115½). Wemple's nomination was not "made unanimous." Attorney General Charles F. Tabor was re-nominated on the first ballot (vote: Tabor 266, John Foley 115). State Engineer John Bogart was re-nominated by acclamation. Ex-Attorney General Denis O'Brien (in office 1884–1887) was nominated unanimously for the Court of Appeals after the name of Edward S. Rapallo had been proposed but withdrawn considering the ballots for Comptroller and Attorney General. The ticket, composed by Gov. David B. Hill and ordered to be pushed through the convention, had actually been published two days before the delegates met.

Members of the disbanding Greenback Party met on October 21 at the Grand Central Hotel in New York City. George O. Jones presided. They nominated Thomas K. Beecher for Secretary of State; J. Madison Hall, of Madison County, for Treasurer; John B. Sullivan, of Westchester County, for Comptroller; and James Wright, of Wayne County, for Attorney General.

== Results ==
The whole Democratic ticket was elected.

The incumbents Wemple, Tabor and Bogart were re-elected.

1889 state election results
Office	Democratic ticket		Republican ticket		Prohibition ticket		Greenback ticket	
Secretary of State	Frank Rice	505,893	John I. Gilbert	485,363	Jesse H. Griffen	26,753	Thomas K. Beecher	753
Comptroller	Edward Wemple	500,344	Martin W. Cooke	488,146	Benjamin L. Rand	26,089	John B. Sullivan	
Attorney General	Charles F. Tabor	499,477	James M. Varnum	488,768	Coleridge A. Hart	26,563	James Wright	730
Treasurer	Elliott Danforth	502,319	Ira M. Hedges	488,397	Joseph W. Bruce	26,194	J. Madison Hall	706
State Engineer	John Bogart	504,040	William V. Van Rensselaer	486,921	Alpheus B. Kenyon	26,794	Leonard Henkle	606
Judge of the Court of Appeals	Denis O'Brien	502,639	Albert Haight	487,567	Walter Farrington	25,199		

== See also ==
- New York state elections

== Sources ==
- The tickets: LIST OF ALL THE CANDIDATES TO BE VOTED FOR IN NEW-YORK CITY ON TUESDAY in NYT on November 3, 1889
- The Democratic candidates: THE CANDIDATES in NYT on October 2, 1889
- Result: OFFICIAL VOTE OF NEW-YORK STATE CAST AT THE ELECTION HELD ON TUESDAY, NOV. 5, 1889 in NYT on December 6, 1889
- Result in New York City: THE CITY VOTE in NYT on November 21, 1889
- The ballot reform, and how to vote: BALLOT REFORM APPLIED TO THIS ELECTION in NYT on November 4, 1889
