= Eugene F. O'Connor =

American politician

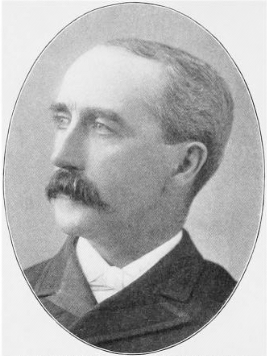

Member of the New York State Senate
- In office 1888–1889
- Constituency: 3rd District

Personal details
- Born: Eugene Franklin O'Connor; November 10, 1844 Brooklyn, New York, US
- Died: March 26, 1928 (aged 83) Brooklyn, New York, US
- Resting place: Holy Cross Cemetery
- Party: Republican
- Education: St. Francis College
- Occupation: Lawyer, politician

Eugene Franklin O'Connor (November 10, 1844 – March 26, 1928) was an American lawyer and politician from New York.

== Life ==
O'Connor was born on November 10, 1844, in Brooklyn, New York. He attended St. Francis Xavier College and St. Francis College, graduating from the latter with a Master of Arts.

In November 1862, during the American Civil War, O'Connor enrolled in the 176th New York Volunteer Infantry under the name "Eugene Franklin." He was promoted to corporal of Company K in January 1863. In January 1864, he was again promoted to second lieutenant. In October 1864, he was wounded at the Battle of Cedar Creek. Because of his wounds from the battle, he was discharged in December 1864.

After the War, O'Connor became captain of the Mohawk Club, a Brooklyn baseball team. He worked as a civil engineer for the Union Pacific Railroad. He attended New York University School of Law and graduated with a law degree in 1882.

In 1886, O'Connor was the Republican candidate for New York's 4th congressional district, but lost the election to incumbent Peter P. Mahoney. In 1887, he was elected to the New York State Senate, representing the 3rd District. He served in the Senate in 1888 and 1889. In the 1891 New York state election, he was the Republican candidate for Secretary of State of New York, but he lost the election to incumbent Frank Rice. In 1904, Mayor McClellan appointed him to the New York City Civil Service Commission. In 1910, New York City Comptroller William A. Prendergast appointed him auditor of accounts.

He was a member of the Grand Army of the Republic. His children were Eugene F. Jr., J. Edward, Robert Owen, Raymond T., Katherine F., Virginia S., Josephine M., and Mrs. Francis Chase Russell.

O'Connor died at home on March 26, 1928. He was buried in Holy Cross Cemetery.

New York State Senate
Preceded by Stephen M. Griswold	New York State Senate; 3rd District; 1888–1889	Succeeded by James W. Birkett
