= 1887 New York state election =

1886 New York state election
- November 8, 1887

The 1887 New York state election was held on November 8, 1887, to elect the Secretary of State, the State Comptroller, the Attorney General, the State Treasurer and the State Engineer, as well as all members of the New York State Assembly and the New York State Senate.

== History ==
The United Labor state convention met on August 17 at Syracuse, New York. Louis F. Post, the Greenback candidate for Attorney General in 1883, was elected Temporary Chairman by the Henry George faction with 91 votes over Frank J. Ferrall, a "colored delegate from New York City", who was nominated by William Penn Rogers and received 69 votes. The convention lasted another two days, and nominated Henry George for Secretary of State, Victor A. Wilder for Comptroller, Patrick H. Cummins for Treasurer, Dennis C. Feely for Attorney General, and Sylvanus H. Sweet for State Engineer. Ex-State Engineer Sweet (in office 1874–1875 as a Democrat) declined to run.

The Prohibition state convention met on August 25 at Syracuse, New York. Rev. I. K. Funk was Temporary Chairman until the choice of Henry Clay Bascom as president.

The Republican state convention met on September 14 at the Skating Rink in Saratoga Springs, New York. Seth Low was Temporary Chairman until the choice of Warner Miller as president. Frederick D. Grant was nominated for Secretary of State by acclamation. Jesse S. L'Amoreaux was nominated for Comptroller during the first ballot. James H. Carmicheal, of Buffalo, was nominated for Treasurer. Maj. James A. Dennison, of Fulton County, was nominated for Attorney General during the first ballot. Oliver H. P. Cornell was nominated for State Engineer on the first ballot (vote: Cornell 353, Verplanck Colvin 326).

The Democratic state convention met at Saratoga Springs.

The Progressive Labor state convention met on September 28 at Webster Hall in New York City. William Penn Rogers, called the meeting to order, and made a speech repudiating Henry George and his United Labor Party. H. A. Barker was Temporary Chairman and chairman of the day session; George Block was chairman of the evening session. John Swinton was nominated for Secretary of State. H. A. Barker, a cigarmaker of Albany, was nominated for Comptroller. Henry Emrich, General Secretary of the Furniture Workers Union, was nominated for Treasurer. Thaddeus B. Wakeman was nominated for Attorney General. Swinton declined the nomination, instead choosing to run for the State Senate's 7th district (a race which he would lose), and the convention nominated J. Edward Hall for Secretary of State.

The Greenback-Labor state convention met on October 4 at Albany, New York, and nominated Thomas K. Beecher for Secretary of State.

== Results ==
The whole Democratic ticket was elected.

The incumbents Cook and Fitzgerald were re-elected.

1887 state election results
Office	Democratic ticket		Republican ticket		United Labor ticket		Prohibition ticket		Progressive Labor ticket		Union Labor ticket		Greenback ticket		Reform ticket
Secretary of State	Frederick Cook	469,888	Frederick D. Grant	452,881	Henry George	70,005	D. W. C. Huntington	41,850	J. Edward Hall	7,622	Orville Preston	1,017	Thomas K. Beecher	953	D. W. C. Huntington
Comptroller	Edward Wemple	470,430	Jesse S. L'Amoreaux	455,056	Victor A. Wilder	66,252	C. B. Hitchcock	42,363	Herbert A. Barker	7,529	Ashbel Clapp	1,022	Sylvester Tripp	879	Edward Evans
Attorney General	Charles F. Tabor	469,349	James A. Dennison	455,577	Dennis C. Feely	67,205	Silas W. Mason	40,286	Thaddeus B. Wakeman	7,672	Wauhlin B. Bernard	1,019	(none)		C. H. Hammond
Treasurer	Lawrence J. Fitzgerald	468,338	James H. Carmichael	457,312	Patrick H. Cummins	65,601	William W. Smith	42,216	Henry Emerich	7,748	John J. Ryan	1,011	J. Madison Hall	880	S. M. Douglas
State Engineer	John Bogart	469,349	Oliver H. P. Cornell	456,288	Matthew K. Couzens	66,689	John G. Gray	42,234	R. F. Barnes	8,530	R. F. Barnes		Edwin A. Stillman	923	Cyrus K. Porter

== See also ==
- New York state elections

== Sources ==
- The tickets: A LIST OF THE CANDIDATES ON THE VARIOUS TICKETS in NYT on November 7, 1887
- Result in Queens County: THE QUEENS COUNTY VOTE in NYT on November 15, 1887
- Result in New York County: COMPLETING THE CANVASS in NYT on November 22, 1887
- Vote totals: OFFICIAL VOTE OF THE STATE in NYT on December 6, 1887 (subscription required)
- Results: The Tribune Almanac 1888
