= William Andrew Sutherland =

American lawyer and politician (1849–1908)

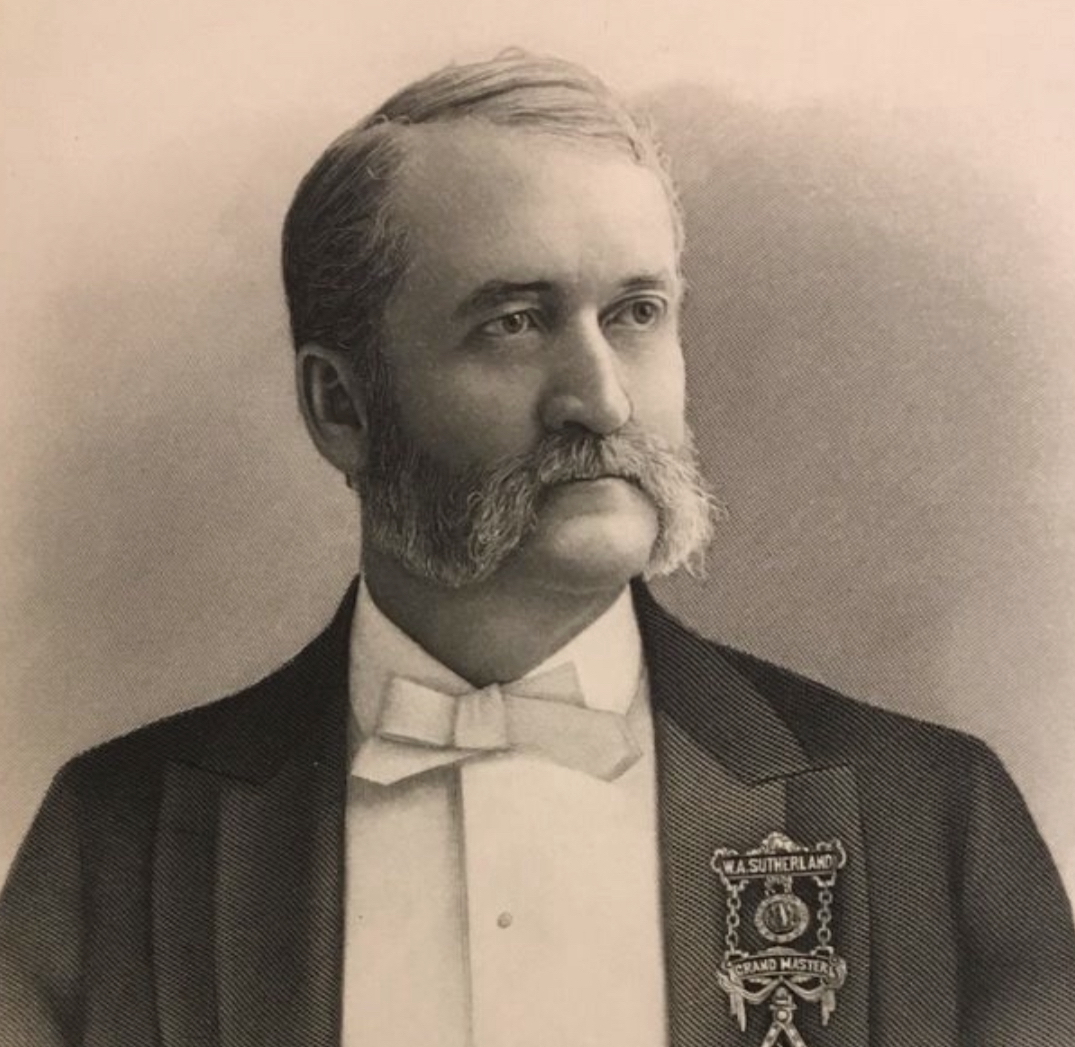
- Born: May 30, 1849; Hopewell, New York, US
- Died: March 11, 1908 (aged 58); Rochester, New York, US
- Education: Genesee Wesleyan Seminary; Genesee College
- Occupations: Lawyer, politician
- Political party: Republican
- Spouses: Inez L. Jackson (m. 1878; died 1905) Clara E. Bowen (m. 1906)
- Children: 1

William Andrew Sutherland (May 30, 1849 – March 11, 1908) was an American lawyer and politician from New York.

== Life ==
Sutherland was born on May 30, 1849, in Hopewell, New York. He was the son of Rev. Andrew Sutherland and Mary McLean. He attended the Genesee Wesleyan Seminary and Genesee College in Lima, New York. He was a member of the Psi Upsilon fraternity.

After finishing school, Sutherland read law in the office of future New York Supreme Court Justice Edwin A. Nash. He was admitted to practice in 1874. He practiced in Lima until 1876, when he moved to Mount Morris. He served as Clerk of the Livingston County Board of Supervisors in 1876, 1878, and 1879. He moved to Rochester in 1884.

In the 1891 New York state election, Sutherland was the Republican candidate for Attorney General of New York, but he lost the election to Simon W. Rosendale. He was a member of the Republican National Committee from 1892 to 1896. He was a delegate to the 1896 Republican National Convention.

Sutherland was an associate counsel for the Lexow Committee in 1894, a New York State Senate probe tasked with investigating police corruption . He was president of the Rochester Bar Association and corporation counsel for Rochester. He was also a director of the Central Bank of Rochester.

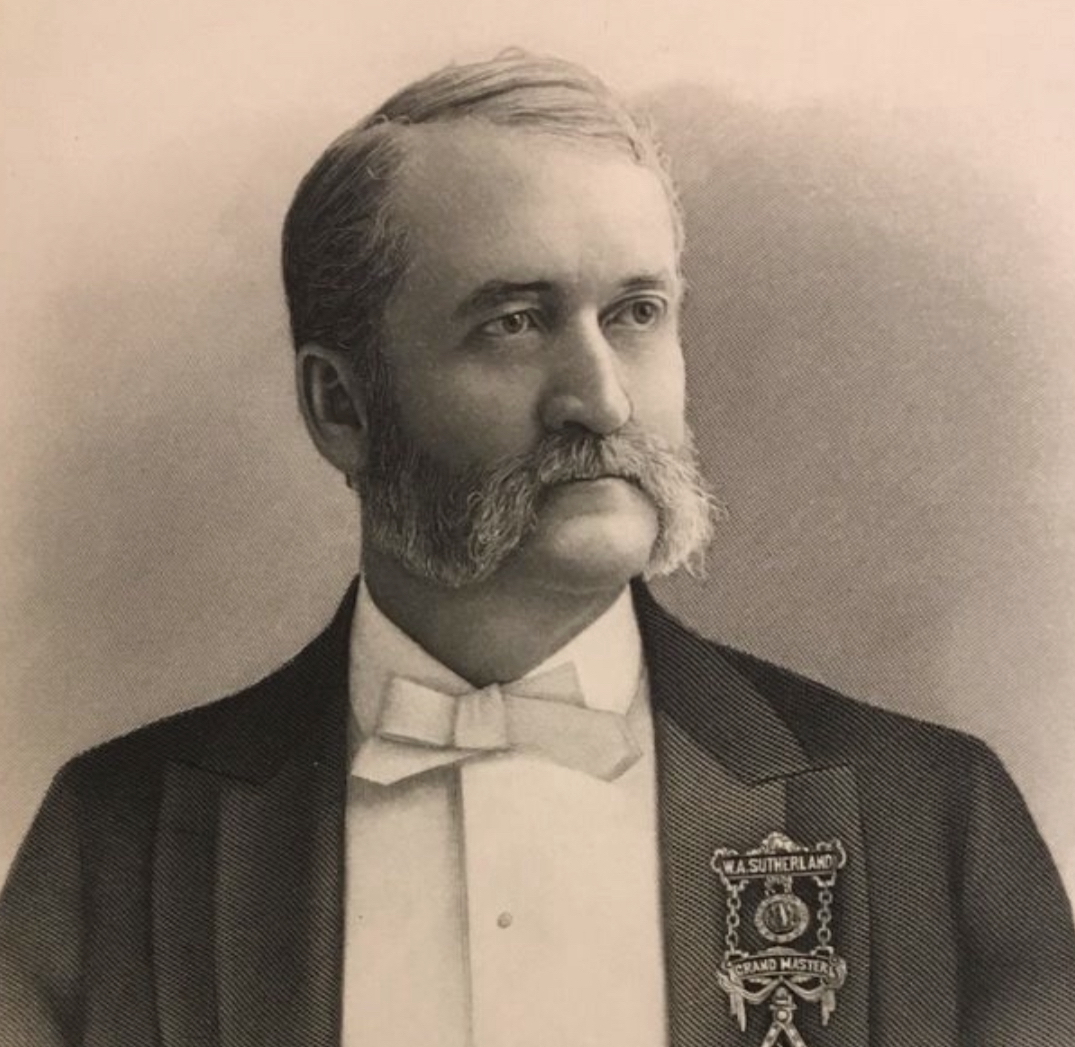
Portrait of Attorney William Andrew Sutherland

Sutherland became a freemason in 1870 in Union Lodge 45 in Lima, NY. Later he joined the Scottish Rite, Royal Arch Masonry, the Order of the Eastern Star, and the Knights Templar. In 1897, he was elected Grand Master of the Grand Lodge of New York.

He married Inez L. Jackson in 1878. They had one son, Carroll Arthur. After Inez died in 1905, Sutherland married Clara E. Bowen.

Sutherland was a Methodist until 1905, at which point he became a Presbyterian. Three years later on March 11, 1908, he died in Rochester City Hospital, just a few weeks after he was appointed counsel for the New York Public Service Commission's Second District. He had suffered from a nervous breakdown. His grave is at Creekside Cemetery in Churchville.

== Notable Relatives ==
One of Sutherland's brothers was New York Supreme Court Justice Arthur E. Sutherland. Harvard Law School professor Arthur E. Sutherland, Jr., was his nephew. One of his father's brothers, Fletcher Sutherland was famous as an entrepreneur and the father of the Seven Sutherland Sisters.

== Publications ==
A collection of Sutherland's speeches in the Masonic order was published by the Masons in 1899, Addresses, M W William A Sutherland, Grand Master of Masons in the State of New York, 1897-1899.
