= James A. Roberts =

American politician (1847–1922)

James Arthur Roberts
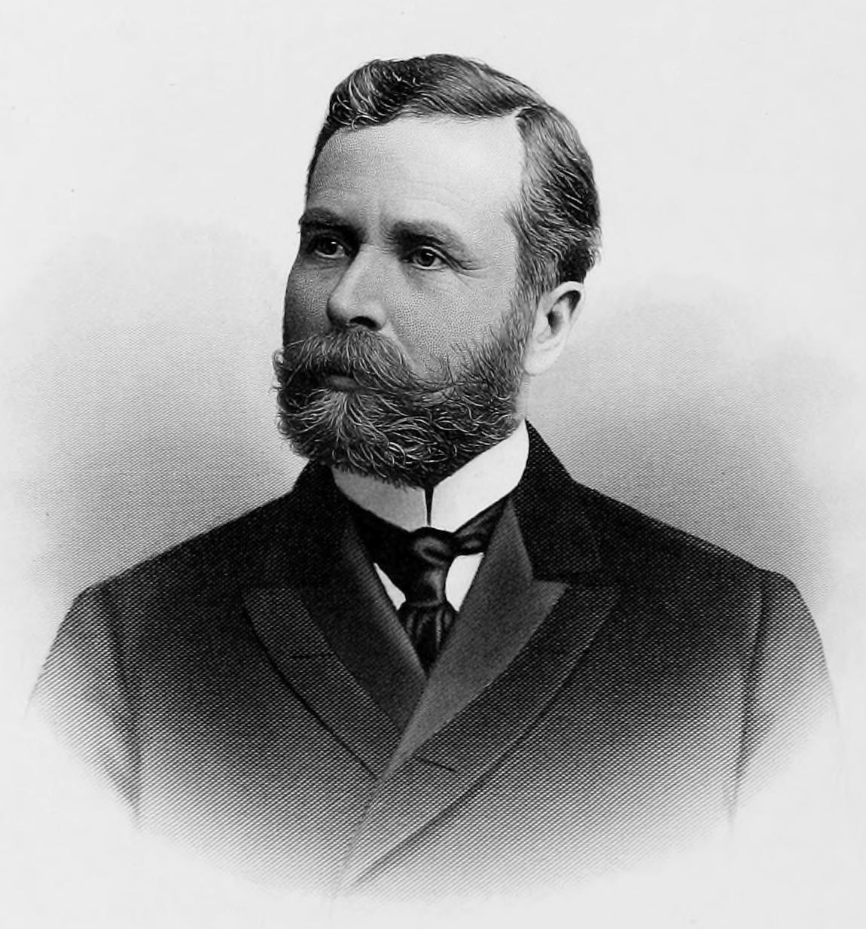

Comptroller of New York
- In office 1894–1898
- Governor: Levi P. Morton; Frank S. Black
- Preceded by: Frank Campbell
- Succeeded by: William J. Morgan

New York State Assembly
- In office 1879–1880

Personal details
- Born: March 8, 1847 Waterboro, Maine
- Died: November 19, 1922 (aged 75) New York City
- Resting place: Forest Lawn Cemetery
- Party: Republican
- Spouse(s): Minerva (Pineo) Roberts (1871-1883, her death); Martha Dresser Roberts (1884-1922, his death)
- Education: Bowdoin College

James Arthur Roberts (March 8, 1847 – November 19, 1922) was an American lawyer and politician. He was a member of the New York State Assembly and was also the New York State Comptroller.

== Early life ==
Roberts was born in Waterboro, Maine on March 8, 1847. He was the son of Jeremiah Roberts and Alma Roberts. He attended common schools and the Edward Little Institute in Auburn, Maine.

In 1864 when he was seventeen years old, Roberts enlisted as a private in the 7th Maine Battery. He fought at the Siege of Petersburg, and later participated in the campaign ending with the surrender of General Robert E. Lee at Appomattox Court House.

Roberts attended Bowdoin College, graduating with an A. B. in 1870. While there, he was a member of Delta Kappa Epsilon. He then taught in the Buffalo, New York public schools while studying law with Edgar B. Perkins and George S. Wardwell. He was admitted to the bar in 1875.

== Career ==
From 1875 until 1894, Roberts practiced law in Buffalo. In 1899, he was head of the firm Roberts, Becker, Messer & Orcutt.

He was a founder of Depew, a suburb of Buffalo, and was also the secretary of the Depew Improvement Company. He was the vice president of the Bellevue and Lancaster Railway Company and the Bellevue Loan, Trust & Safe Deposit Company. He was a director and secretary of the Buffalo General Electric Company and director of the Hydraulic Bank of Buffalo. He was also secretary of the Bellevue Land Company.

Roberts became an assemblyman for Erie County in 1878. He was elected the New York State Assembly in 1879 (Erie Co., 3rd D.) and 1880 (Erie Co., 4th D.). He did not run for a third term. Robert was the Buffalo Parks Commissioner from 1891 to1893.

In 1894, Roberts left Buffalo to serve as New York State Comptroller, serving two terms from 1894 to 1898. He was elected to the position 1893 and 1895, on the Republican ticket. He was an alternate delegate to the 1900 Republican National Convention.

== Personal life ==
On June 1, 1871, he married Minnie Pineo of Calais, Maine. They had two children: son Joseph Roberts and daughter Amelia, who married Frank St. John Sidway. Minnie died in 1883. Roberts married Martha Dresser in 1884. She was the daughter of Judge Dresser of Auburn, Maine.

Roberts belonged to the Acacia Club, the Buffalo Club, the Knight of Pythias, and the Freemasons. He was a member of the Grand Army of the Republic, the Society of Colonial Wars, and the Sons of the American Revolution.

Roberts lived in New York City from 1902 until his death there on November 19, 1922. He was buried at Forest Lawn Cemetery in Buffalo.

== References, ==
New York State Assembly
Preceded by David F. Day	New York State Assembly; Erie County, 3rd District; 1879	Succeeded by James Ash
Preceded by Harvey J. Hurd	New York State Assembly; Erie County, 4th District; 1880	Succeeded by George Bingham
Political offices
Preceded by Frank Campbell	New York State Comptroller; 1894–1898	Succeeded by William J. Morgan
