= Frank Campbell (New York politician) =

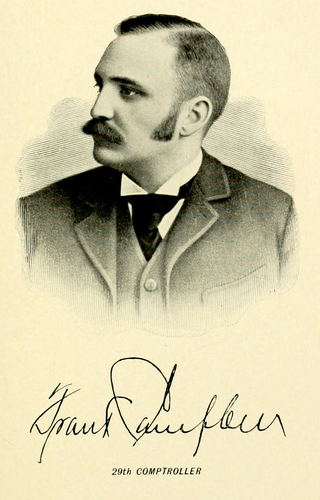

29th Comptroller of New York
- In office January 1, 1892 – December 31, 1893
- Governor: Roswell P. Flower
- Preceded by: Edward Wemple
- Succeeded by: James A. Roberts

Chairperson of the New York State Democratic Committee
- In office September 1898 – April 1904
- Preceded by: Elliot Danforth
- Succeeded by: Cord Meyer

Personal details
- Born: March 27, 1858 Bath, New York, U.S.
- Died: February 20, 1924 (aged 65)
- Party: Democratic
- Spouse: Mary Louise Campbell (m. 1873; died 1914)
- Education: Haverling Academy

Frank Campbell (March 27, 1858 in Bath, Steuben County, New York – February 20, 1924) was an American banker and politician.

== Life ==
He was the son of Lt. Gov. Robert Campbell and Frances Fowler Campbell. He was educated at Haverling Academy and at Trenton, New Jersey. In 1879, he married Mary Louise Willson (d. 1914), and their son was Willson R. Campbell.

With his brother Clarence he founded the Campbell Brothers Bank in Bath in 1880. After dissolving the partnership, he organized the Farmers & Mechanics Bank of Bath, of which he was Cashier until 1922, and then President until his death.

As a Democrat he was New York State Comptroller from 1892 to 1893, elected in 1891 but defeated for re-election in 1893. He was a delegate to the 1892 Democratic National Convention in Chicago. He was Chairman of the New York State Democratic Committee from 1898 to 1904.

== Sources ==
- The History of New York State at www.usgennet.org The History of New York State edited by Dr. James Sullivan (Biographies, Part 23), at usgennet
- The Political Graveyard: Index to Politicians: Campbell, E to F at politicalgraveyard.com Political Graveyard

Political offices
Preceded by Edward Wemple	New York State Comptroller; 1892–1893	Succeeded by James A. Roberts
Party political offices
Preceded by Elliott Danforth	New York State Democratic Committee Chairman; September 1898 – April 1904	Succeeded by Cord Meyer
