= Campbell W. Adams =

American civil engineer (1852–1930)

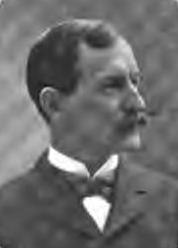
- Adams in 1897
- Born: December 9, 1852; Utica, New York
- Died: November 7, 1930 (aged 77)
- Education: Utica Free Academy
- Occupation: Surveyor

Campbell W. Adams (December 9, 1852, in Utica, Oneida County, New York – November 1930) was an American civil engineer, surveyor and politician from New York. He was New York State Engineer and Surveyor from 1894 to 1898.

== Life ==
Adams was educated at the Utica Free Academy. In 1872, he became an assistant to William H. Christian, City Surveyor of Utica, and in the following year, when Christian's term expired, they formed a partnership and carried on a general surveying business. In 1872 and 1874 Adams had charge of building the Savage Reservoir at the end of Pleasant Street, Utica, for the Utica Water Works. From 1875 to 1880, he was a traveling salesman for the firm of Adams Bros., rope manufacturers.

From 1880 to 1885, he was city surveyor of Utica. Afterwards he was constructing engineer for the Delaware and Hudson Canal Company, on the Albany and Susquehanna division, but a year later returned to Utica and served as Assistant City Surveyor during Mayor Kinney's administration. In 1887, he was employed as Resident Engineer for the Rome, Watertown and Ogdensburg Railroad, supervising the construction of the branch from Rochester, New York, to Windsor Beach on Lake Ontario; of a viaduct at Harpursville; and of a bridge over the Genesee River. He was again appointed Assistant City Surveyor of Utica in 1888, and in 1891 was one of the engineering corps on the Adirondack and St. Lawrence Railroad. In 1892 and 1893, he was again City Surveyor of Utica.

He was state engineer and surveyor from 1894 to 1898, elected in 1893 and 1895 on the Republican ticket. One of his assistants was Halbert Powers Gillette. From 1901 to 1903, Adams was engaged in building a railway and harbor for the Dunderland Iron Co., Ltd., of London, England, on the west coast of Norway, near the Arctic Circle. Until 1905, he remained as superintendent of this work, during which time the plant has been completed for mining, concentrating and briquetting about 2,500 tons daily of iron ore for shipment to England. In December 1905, he was made general manager of the entire works.

Adams died on November 7, 1930, in Belleville, New Jersey.

== Sources ==
- CANDIDATES OF THE PARTIES - Presentation of the candidates for state office, in the New York Times on November 5, 1893

Political offices
Preceded by Martin Schenck	New York State Engineer and Surveyor; 1894 – 1898	Succeeded by Edward A. Bond
