= John Palmer (1842–1905) =

American politician

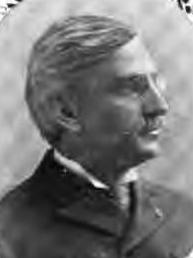
- Palmer in 1897

Secretary of State of New York
- In office January 1, 1894 – December 31, 1898
- Governor: Roswell P. Flower; Levi P. Morton; Frank S. Black
- Preceded by: Frank Rice
- Succeeded by: John T. McDonough

Commander-in-Chief of the Grand Army of the Republic
- In office 1891–1892
- Preceded by: Wheelock G. Veazey
- Succeeded by: Augustus G. Weissert

Personal details
- Born: March 22, 1842 Staten Island, New York, U.S.
- Died: April 15, 1905 (aged 63) Albany, New York, U.S.
- Resting place: Albany Rural Cemetery
- Party: Republican
- Spouse: Margaret Moore (m. 1867)
- Children: 4
- Occupation: House painter and decorator

John Palmer (March 22, 1842 – April 15, 1905 in Albany, New York) was an American politician who served as Secretary of State of New York from 1894 to 1898.

== Early life ==
Palmer was born in Stapleton, Staten Island, a son of John and Rebecca Palmer. His parents returned with him to England when Palmer was still a small child. Later he accompanied his seafaring grandfather, and witnessed the Siege of Sevastopol during the Crimean War from their freighter. When his parents returned to the United States, settled in Bath-on-the-Hudson, New York, and opened a paint shop, Palmer joined them and became a house painter.

== Military career ==
At the outbreak of the American Civil War, he enlisted as a private in the 91st Regiment of New York Volunteers and fought his way up to be brevetted a captain of volunteers, participating in the campaigns of the Army of the Gulf under General Nathaniel P. Banks. His father, who had enlisted too, was killed in battle at Petersburg, Virginia. At the expiration of his three-year enlistment, Palmer re-enlisted, and the regiment was transferred to the V Corps of the Army of the Potomac under General G. K. Warren. He was seriously injured at the Battle of Five Forks when a shot horse fell on top of him, and his back was cut by the sword of its rider.

== Political career ==
After the war, he returned to Albany and resumed his trade as a house painter. He became President of the Albany Builders' Exchange, Chairman of the Arbitration Committee, President of the Painters' Association of the State of New York, Vice President of the Decorators's and Painters' Association of the United States.

In August 1891, at the national encampment at Detroit, he was chosen Commander-in-Chief of the Grand Army of the Republic. He was also a member of the New York Commandery of the Military Order of the Loyal Legion of the United States.

'He was Chairman of the committee appointed by the National Encampment to visit President Cleveland during his first term.'

He was Secretary of State of New York from 1894 to 1898, elected in 1893 and 1895 on the Republican ticket. He is the maternal grandfather of John Palmer Harcourt Jr, a retired educator who served as assistant secretary to the Governor Nelson Rockefeller.

The building that now houses the Albany Damien Center was originally constructed for Palmer and his family in 1875. "Following his death, ownership was transferred to Palmer’s wife, Margaret, but the property was then sold in 1910 to the Vice President of Ryan & Graves Insurance, Samuel C Harcourt."

== Personal life and death ==
He married Margaret Moore in 1867, and they had four children.

He died on April 15, 1905 in Albany.

== Sources ==
- Presentation of the new Secretary of State, in NYT on December 24, 1893
- Short bios of state officers elected in 1895, in NYT on November 6, 1895
- Obituary in NYT on April 16, 1905
- Political Graveyard
- His wife's obituary notice, in NYT on May 6, 1922

Honorary titles
Preceded by Wheelock G. Veazey	Commander-in-Chief of the Grand Army of the Republic; 1891–1892	Succeeded by Augustus G. Weissert
Political offices
Preceded by Frank Rice	Secretary of State of New York; 1894–1898	Succeeded by John T. McDonough
