= John G. Wickser =

American politician (1856–1928)

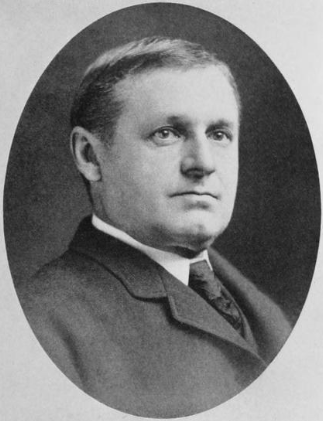
- Wickser c. 1908

New York State Treasurer
- In office 1903–1904

Personal details
- Born: John George Wickser; 1856
- Died: July 1, 1928 (aged 71–72) Buffalo, New York, U.S.
- Party: Republican
- Occupation: Businessman, politician

John G. Wickser (1856–1928) was an American businessman and politician.

== Life ==
John G. Wickser was born in Buffalo, New York in 1856, a nephew of Mayor of Buffalo Philip Becker. He was President of the Buffalo German Insurance Company and the Buffalo Commercial Insurance Company.

As a Republican, he was New York State Treasurer from 1903 to 1904, elected at the New York state election, 1902. As Treasurer, he was a member of the Board of Parole which in 1904 denied number racketeer Albert J. Adams's application for parole.

He was a presidential elector in 1908.

Wickser died in Buffalo on July 1, 1928.

== Sources ==
- History of Germans in Buffalo
- His nomination at the Rep. state convention, in NYT on September 25, 1902
- The Republican nominees, in NYT on September 25, 1902
- His appointments for Treasury officers, in NYT on December 28, 1902
- Calling on Nathan Lewis Miller, in NYT on December 12, 1920

Political offices
Preceded by John P. Jaeckel	New York State Treasurer; 1903–1904	Succeeded by John G. Wallenmeier Jr.
