= Augustus G. Weissert =

American military officer (1844–1923)

Augustus Gordon Weissert
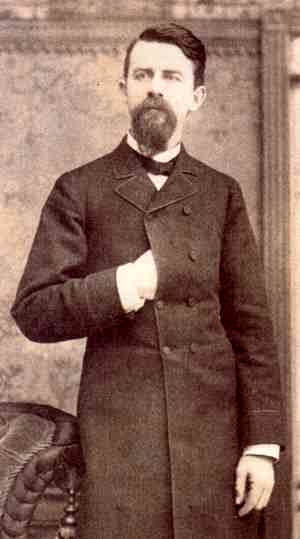
- Born: August 7, 1844; Canton, Ohio
- Died: April 24, 1923 (aged 78); Milwaukee, Wisconsin
- Burial place: Forest Home Cemetery, Milwaukee, Wisconsin
- Military career
- Allegiance: United States of America; Union
- Branch: United States Army; Union Army
- Service years: 1861–1865
- Rank: Sergeant Major; Brevet Captain
- Units: Company K, 8th Wisconsin Infantry
- Conflicts: American Civil War: Battle of Iuka; Battle of Corinth; Siege of Vicksburg; Red River Campaign; Battle of Nashville
- Other work: 21st Commander-in-Chief of the Grand Army of the Republic, Milwaukee school board

Augustus Gordon Weissert (August 7, 1844 – April 24, 1923) was an American soldier who served in the Union Army during the American Civil War and as the 21st Commander-in-Chief of the Grand Army of the Republic (1892–1893).

== Early life and military career ==
Weissert was born August 7, 1844, in Canton, Ohio, to Michael and Magdalene (Bernard) Weissert. His family moved to Racine, Wisconsin, when he was a young boy. Weissert attended the University of Michigan where he pursued a degree in law and graduated with a Bachelor of Laws. He then moved to New York in 1860 to continue the study of law, but returned to Wisconsin when the Civil War began.

He enlisted September 10, 1861, at age 17, as a private in Company K, 8th Wisconsin Infantry; he had previously attempted to enlist, but was rejected due to his age. Weissert was promoted to sergeant major, September 3, 1864. At the Battle of Nashville, Weissert was wounded by a musket ball in the leg just above the knee. Although he recovered from his wound, it remained an open wound for many years and the bullet was never removed. Weissert received a brevet promotion to captain dated to June 6, 1864, for "conspicuous bravery during the Red River expedition and for gallantry at Lake Chicot, Arkansas, June 6, 1864, and at Nashville, December 15th." He was subsequently offered an appointment to the United States Military Academy, but he declined due to his wound. Weissert mustered out September 17, 1865, with the regiment and returned to Milwaukee, Wisconsin, where he continued to study law under Wisconsin Supreme Court Justice William P. Lyon.

== Post-war service ==
Weissert joined the Grand Army of the Republic in 1866 and served as commander of E. B. Wilcott Post #1 in Milwaukee. He was elected to command the Department of Wisconsin in 1888 and again in 1889. At the 23rd National Encampment, Weissert was elected Senior Vice Commander-in-Chief. In 1892, he was elected 21st Commander-in-Chief of the G.A.R. after having been defeated for the position the previous year.

Weissert remained active in civic duties in Milwaukee, predominantly as a member of the Milwaukee Board of Education. President Theodore Roosevelt appointed Weissert to the Board of Visitors of the U.S. Military Academy in 1904.

Weissert died April 24, 1923, at his home in Milwaukee, and is buried in the city's Forest Home Cemetery.

== See also ==
- List of Grand Army of the Republic commanders-in-chief

Political offices
Preceded by John Palmer	Commander-in-Chief of the Grand Army of the Republic; 1892 – 1893	Succeeded by John G. B. Adams
