= Charles F. Tabor =

American politician

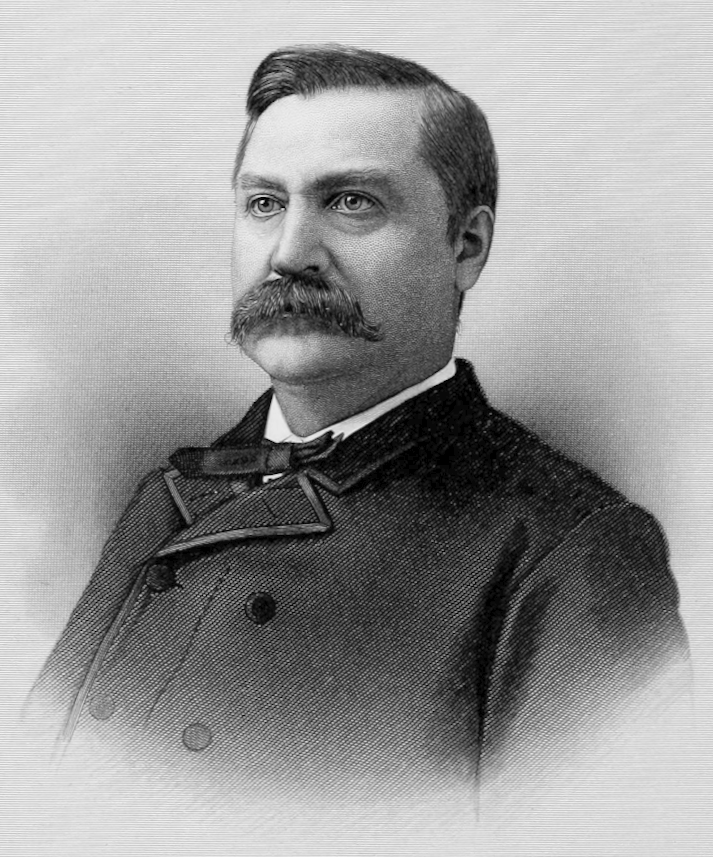
- Born: Charles Franklin Tabor; June 28, 1841; St. Joseph County, Michigan, U.S.
- Died: March 3, 1915 (aged 73); Buffalo, New York, U.S.
- Occupations: Lawyer, politician
- Title: New York Attorney General
- Term: 1888-1891
- Political party: Democratic
- Spouse: Phebe S. Andrews (m. 1863)
- Children: Georgia E. Tabor
- Parent(s): Silas Tabor; Betsey E. Russell

Signature
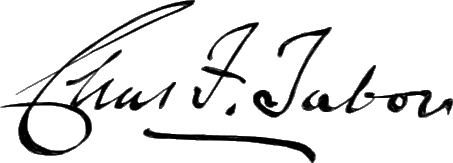

Charles Franklin Tabor (June 28, 1841 – March 3, 1915) was an American lawyer and politician.

== Life ==
He was born on June 28, 1841, in St. Joseph County, Michigan, to Silas Tabor (c. 1820 – 1863) and Betsey E. (Russell) Tabor.

In 1843, the family removed to Newstead, New York. He was educated at academies in Clarence and Williamsville, Buffalo suburbs, and at the seminary in Lima. In 1861, he went to Buffalo, New York, to study law in the office of Humphrey & Parsons, and was admitted to the bar in 1863.

On December 24, 1863, he married Phebe S. Andrews, and their daughter was Georgia E. Tabor.

In 1868 he formed a partnership with Judge Thomas Corlett, and six years later, when Judge Corlett retired, formed a partnership with William F. Sheehan. Tabor was a member of the New York State Assembly (Erie Co., 4th D.) in 1876 and 1877. In 1888, John Cunneen and Edward E. Coatsworth were admitted to the firm under the name of Tabor, Sheehan, Cunneen & Coatsworth. In 1895, Tabor became the senior member of the law firm of Tabor & Wilkie.

In 1881 and 1882 he was Supervisor of Lancaster, New York, where he resided from 1867 to 1883 when he removed to Buffalo. He was an excise commissioner of Erie County for three years.

As a Democrat, he was New York Attorney General from 1888 to 1891, elected in 1887 and 1889. He vacated the charter of the Sugar Trust of New York on the ground that it was a monopoly. As attorney-general he also had charge of the litigation which involved the constitutionality of the electrocution law and succeeded in obtaining a decision from the U. S. Supreme Court to the effect that the law was constitutional and valid. He also obtained from that court an affirmation of a decision of the New York Court of Appeals in the case of the Home Insurance Company, that corporations were liable to taxation on their capital stock although that stock consisted of government bonds, otherwise exempt.

In 1899 he ran for justice of the New York Supreme Court, but was defeated.

He died on March 3, 1915, at his home in Buffalo, New York, at age 74.

New York State Assembly
| Preceded by Harry B. Ransom | New York State Assembly; Erie County, 4th District; 1876–1877 | Succeeded by Harvey J. Hurd |
Legal offices
| Preceded by Denis O'Brien | New York State Attorney General; 1888–1891 | Succeeded by Simon W. Rosendale |
