= John P. Jaeckel =

American politician

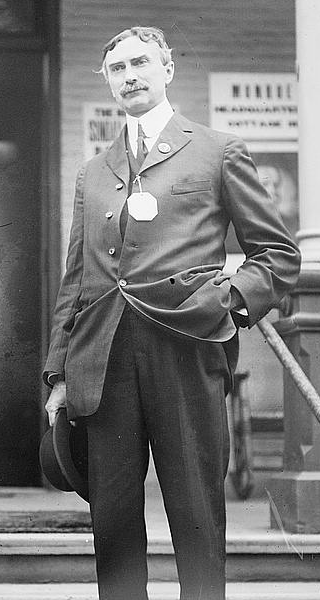
- Jaeckel circa 1912

New York State Treasurer
- In office 1899–1902

Personal details
- Born: April 22, 1865; Syracuse, New York, U.S.
- Died: June 16, 1941 (aged 76); Auburn, New York, U.S.

John P. Jaeckel (April 22, 1865 – June 16, 1941) was an American politician.

== Biography ==
Jaeckel was born on April 22, 1865, to German parents in Syracuse, New York. The family then moved to Auburn, New York. He worked as a money order clerk at the Auburn post office, and later as a clerk and bookkeeper for a coal dealer.

As a Republican, he was Auburn City Treasurer from 1895 to 1898. He was New York State Treasurer from 1899 to 1902, elected in 1898 and 1900.

On October 29, 1901, he was the foreman of the witnesses to the execution of Leon Czolgosz at Auburn State Prison.

He was president of the New York State Prison Commission, and a member of the New York State Board of Parole which in 1904 denied number racketeer Albert J. Adams's application for parole.

In 1920, he was chosen the first Auburn City Manager. He died on June 16, 1941, in Auburn, New York.

Political offices
Preceded by Addison B. Colvin	New York State Treasurer; 1899–1902	Succeeded by John G. Wickser
