= Addison B. Colvin =

American businessman and politician

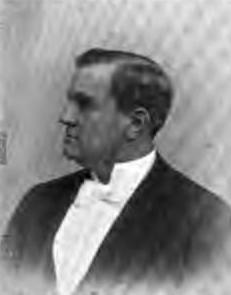
Colvin c. 1897

Addison Beecher Colvin (December 15, 1858 in Glens Falls, Warren County, New York – June 21, 1939 in Glens Falls, Warren County, New York) was an American businessman, banker and politician.

== Life ==
He was the son of Hiram K. Colvin and Sara Ann Cowels Colvin. On May 16, 1883, he married Maria Louise Hees at Fonda, New York, and they had three daughters.

He was New York State Treasurer from 1894 to 1898, elected in 1893 and 1895 on the Republican ticket. He appointed his brother-in-law Deputy Treasurer.

He was President of the Glens Falls Gaslight Company, Vice President of the Herkimer, Mohawk, Ilion and Frankfort Railway, and owner of the Glens Falls Daily Times and the Glens Falls Weekly Messenger.

He was buried at Pineview Cemetery in Glens Falls.

== Sources ==
- RootsWeb: COLVIN-L RE: (COLVIN-L) Addison B. Colvin at archiver.rootsweb.ancestry.com Short bio transcribed from Who Was Who in America (Vol. III, pg. 175), at rootsweb
- His "inauguration ceremony", in NYT on January 5, 1894
- The State money deposit controversy, in NYT on January 9, 1894
- A listing of his "titles", in NYT on September 17, 1895
- Short bios of the re-elected state officers, in NYT on November 6, 1895 (giving wrong birth year)

Political offices
Preceded by Elliott Danforth	New York State Treasurer; 1894–1898	Succeeded by John P. Jaeckel
