= John Bogart =

American civil engineer

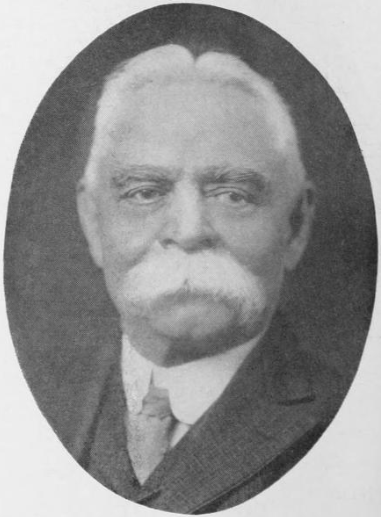
- Born: February 8, 1836; Albany, New York, US
- Died: April 25, 1920 (aged 84); Manhattan, New York, US
- Education: Rutgers College
- Occupation: Engineer
- Political party: Democratic
- Spouse: Emma Cherrington Jefferis (m. 1870)

John Bogart (February 8, 1836 – April 25, 1920) was an American civil engineer from New York. He was appointed and elected to numerous public positions in the New York City metropolitan area. He also served at the state level, for instance as New York State Engineer and Surveyor from 1888 to 1891. As a consulting engineer, he participated in numerous large-scale projects across the country, ranging from parks to bridges and dams.

== Biography ==
Bogart was the son of John Henry Bogart, a merchant of Albany and New York City, and his wife, and the great-grandson of Henry Bogart. He was educated at The Albany Academy and graduated with an M.A. degree from Rutgers College in 1853.

After spending a summer with the engineer corps of the New York Central Railroad, Bogart decided to become an engineer. He began engineering work with the enlargement of the Erie Canal as second assistant engineer from 1856 to 1858. He was assistant engineer on the construction of Central Park in New York City.

From December 1861 to July 1866, Bogart was with the Union Army in an engineering capacity. During this time, he was stationed at Fortress Monroe and was in charge of the fort at Rip Raps, Virginia.

In 1866, Bogart was appointed engineer in charge of construction, and in 1870 as chief engineer of the Park Commission of Brooklyn. From 1872 to 1877, he served as chief engineer of the New York City Department of Public Parks.

In 1870, he married Emma Cherrington Jefferis.

From 1877 on, Bogart was engaged as engineer for many important enterprises, such as the municipal works at New Orleans, Chicago, Nashville and Baltimore, the parks in Albany, New York, the Public State Grounds at Nashville, the West Side parks of Chicago and the park system of Essex County, New York. He was the constructing engineer of Washington Bridge and consulting engineer of the Niagara Falls Power Co., the Atlantic Electric and Water Power Co., the Rapid Transit Commission and of the New York State Board of Health.

From 1886 to 1887, Bogart was the deputy state engineer under Elnathan Sweet. He occupied the office of State Engineer and Surveyor from 1888 to 1891, elected on the Democratic ticket in 1887 and 1889. After his term, he resumed his practice as consulting engineer in New York. Among his projects was designing the Hales Bar Dam powerhouse and dam on the Tennessee River for a private power company, completed in 1913.

Bogart was a member of the American Society of Civil Engineers and the Institution of Civil Engineers of Great Britain. He served as a lieutenant colonel and chief engineer of the New York National Guard.

Bogart died from pneumonia on April 26, 1920 at his home at 640 Madison Avenue in Manhattan.

Political offices
Preceded by Elnathan Sweet	New York State Engineer and Surveyor; 1888 – 1891	Succeeded by Martin Schenck
