= Robert A. Maxwell =

American politician

Robert A. Maxwell (1838, Washington County, New York – June 8, 1912, Batavia, Genesee County, New York) was an American politician

== Life ==
As a Democrat, he was New York State Treasurer from 1882 to 1885, elected in 1881 and 1883. On December 28, 1885, he was appointed as Superintendent of Insurance by Governor David B. Hill to take office on January 1, 1886, and remained in this office until February 1891 when he was succeeded by James F. Pierce.

In March 1893, he was appointed Fourth Assistant U.S. Postmaster General by President Grover Cleveland, and served until the end of Cleveland's administration in March 1897.

In 1896, he supported John M. Palmer of the National Democratic Party for president.

== Sources ==
- Appointed Supt. of Insurance, in NYT on December 29, 1885, Giving wrong middle initial "S.")
- Obit in NYT on June 9, 1912
- The third ticket, in NYT on September 11, 1896
- The Political Graveyard: Index to Politicians: Maxwell at politicalgraveyard.com Political Graveyard
- Removed from office, in NYT on February 11, 1891
- His reforms in the U.S. Postal Dept., in NYT on March 13, 1897

Political offices
Preceded by Nathan D. Wendell	New York State Treasurer; 1882–1885	Succeeded by Lawrence J. Fitzgerald
