= William V. Van Rensselaer =

American civil engineer and politician

William V. Van Rensselaer (December 26, 1838 – May 3, 1904) was an American civil engineer and politician from New York.

== Life ==
Van Rensselaer was born on December 26, 1838, in Seneca Falls, New York. His father was Henry J. Van Rensselaer. Van Rensselaer attended Seneca Falls Academy, and when he was only 18 he was put in charge of the enlargement of the Cayuga–Seneca Canal.

In August 1862, during the American Civil War, he enlisted in the 50th New York Volunteer Engineer Regiment as first lieutenant of Company K. He was promoted to captain in January 1865. He was mustered out with his company in June 1865.

After the war, he returned to Seneca Falls to work as a civil engineer. In 1882, he was appointed Deputy Superintendent of Public Works, in charge of the middle division of the canals. In the 1885 and 1889 New York state elections, he was the Republican nominee for New York State Engineer and Surveyor, losing both times. He served as President of the Seneca Falls village, a member of the Board of Education, and town supervisor of Seneca Falls. He was also a trustee of the Seneca Falls Savings Bank and a vestryman for the Trinity Episcopal Church.

In 1897, he was elected to the New York State Assembly, representing Seneca County. He served in the Assembly in 1898.

Van Rensselaer was manager of the Courier Printing Company for several years. He was a freemason and a member of the Grand Army of the Republic. He died at home on May 3, 1904.

New York State Assembly
| Preceded by Harry M. Glen | New York State Assembly; Seneca County; 1898 | Succeeded by Moses C. Gould |
