= Martin Schenck =

American politician

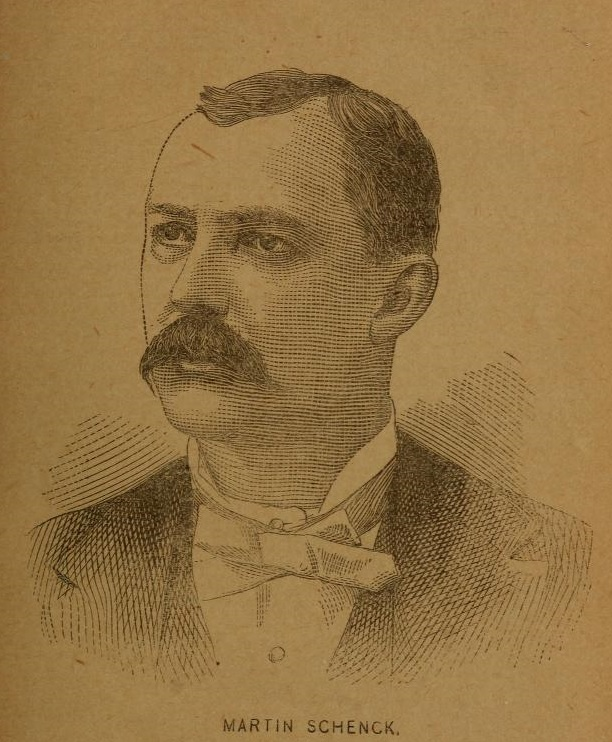
- Martin Schenck (1891)
- Born: January 24, 1848; Palatine Bridge, New York
- Died: September 17, 1918 (aged 70); Albany, New York

Martin Schenck (January 24, 1848 – September 17, 1918) was an American civil engineer and politician from New York. He was New York State Engineer and Surveyor from 1892 to 1893.

== Life ==
He was born on January 24, 1848, in Palatine Bridge, New York, to Benjamin Schenck and Susan (Martin) Schenck.

He graduated C.E. from Union College. In 1869, he began work as a rodman and leveler with the Missouri, Kansas and Texas Railway in Kansas and the Indian Territory. From 1871 to 1872, he was engaged in general engineering. In 1873, he became a leveler on the New York Central and Hudson River Railroad. From 1874 to 1881, was engaged in general engineering and contracting, and was a member of the New York State Assembly (Montgomery Co.) in 1875.

In 1882, he was employed as an engineer for one of the contractors on the West Shore Railroad. From 1883 to 1885, he was inspector and leveler in the New York State Canal Department. From 1886 to 1891, he was Assistant Engineer in charge of the Hudson River improvement and of canal lock lengthening.

He was State Engineer and Surveyor from 1892 to 1893, elected on the Democratic ticket in 1891, but defeated for re-election in 1893 by Republican Campbell W. Adams. In 1898, he ran again for State Engineer and Surveyor on the Democratic ticket, but was defeated again, by Republican Edward A. Bond.

From 1894 to 1895, he was Consulting Engineer to the New York State Board of Health. From 1895 to 1899, he was City Engineer of Troy, New York, and then Chief Engineer of the New York City Department of Parks, and later worked for the Barge Canal Bureau.

He died on September 17, 1918, in Albany, New York.

New York State Assembly
| Preceded by Martin L. Stover | New York State Assembly; Montgomery County; 1875 | Succeeded by George M. Voorhees |
Political offices
| Preceded by John Bogart | New York State Engineer and Surveyor; 1892–1893 | Succeeded by Campbell W. Adams |
