= Edward Wemple =

American politician

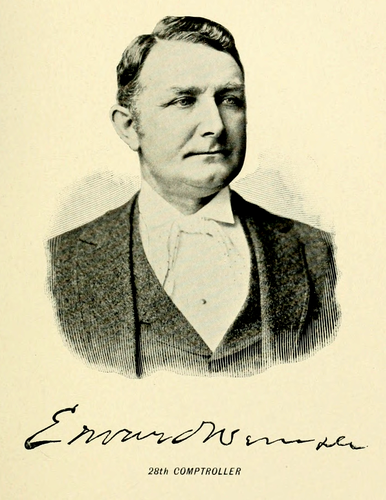

New York State Senator 18th District
- In office 1886–1887
- Preceded by: James Arkell
- Succeeded by: John Foley

Personal details
- Born: October 23, 1843 Fultonville, New York
- Died: December 18, 1920 (aged 77) Fultonville
- Resting place: Maple Avenue Cemetery in Fultonville
- Party: Democratic Party
- Spouse: Adelaide F. Groat
- Children: Six
- Occupation: Businessperson, politician

Edward Wemple (October 23, 1843 in Fultonville, Montgomery County, New York – December 18, 1920 in Fultonville, Montgomery County, New York) was an American businessman and U.S. Representative from New York.

== Life ==
Wemple attended the public schools in Fultonville and Ashland Academy, and graduated from Union College in 1866. Then he studied law for a time and engaged in the foundry business in partnership with his two brothers. In 1868 he married Adelaide F. Groat (1844–1895), and the couple had six children.

He was President of the Village of Fultonville in 1873, and Supervisor of the Town of Glen from 1874 to 1876. He was a member of the New York State Assembly (Montgomery Co.) in 1877 and 1878.

Wemple was elected as a Democrat to the 48th United States Congress, holding office from March 4, 1883, to March 3, 1885. In Congress he worked to secure funding for the Saratoga Monument commemorating the Battles of Saratoga.

He was a member of the New York State Senate (18th D.) in 1886 and 1887. He was New York State Comptroller from 1888 to 1891, elected at the New York state election, 1887 and the New York state election, 1889.

On November 13, 1895, he was arrested on charges of arson. He had burned down his own foundry, after it had been sold at an assignee's sale, and several other buildings in and around Fultonville. On December 2, he was pronounced insane, taken to the Utica Insane Asylum, and later transferred to the Middletown State Hospital. On August 13, 1909, he was released from Middletown Asylum, and taken home to Fultonville.

He died on December 18, 1920; and was buried at the Maple Avenue Cemetery in Fultonville.

== Sources ==
- United States Congress. "Edward Wemple (id: W000292)". Biographical Directory of the United States Congress.
- Pronounced insane, in The New York Times on December 3, 1895
- WEMPLE OUT OF ASYLUM in NYT on August 14, 1909

New York State Senate
Preceded by George M. Voorhees	New York State Assembly; Montgomery County; 1877–1878	Succeeded by John Warner
U.S. House of Representatives
Preceded by George West	Member of the U.S. House of Representatives from New York's 20th congressional district 1883–1885	Succeeded by George West
New York State Senate
Preceded by James Arkell	New York State Senate; 18th District; 1886–1887	Succeeded by John Foley
Political offices
Preceded by Alfred C. Chapin	New York State Comptroller; 1888–1891	Succeeded by Frank Campbell
