= Roswell P. Flower Memorial Library =

Historic Library in Watertown, New York

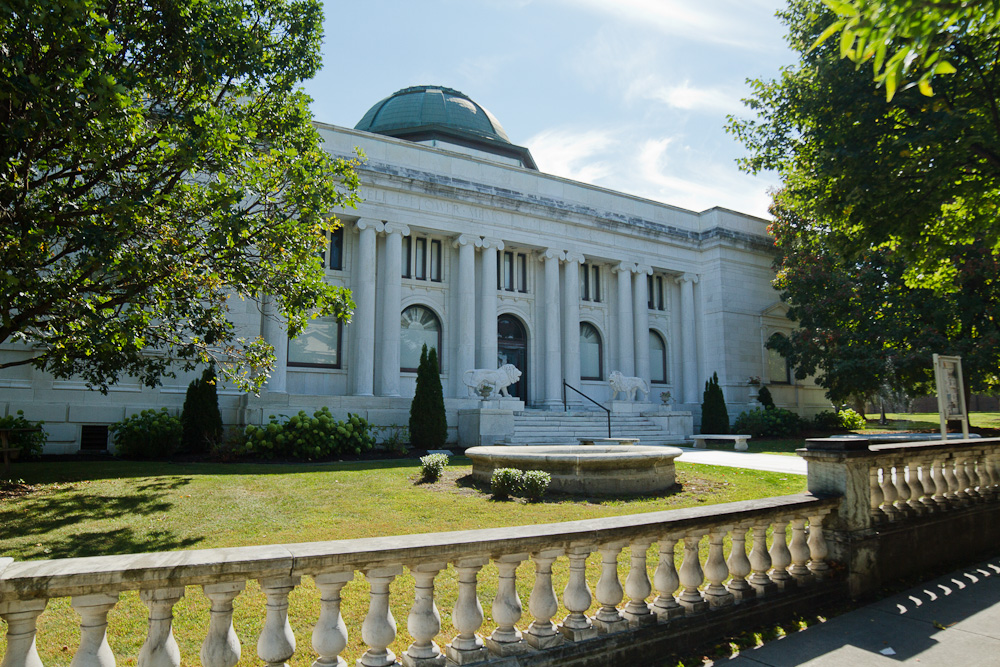
- Roswell P. Flower Memorial Library, 2018
- 43°58′23″N 75°54′37″W
- Type: Public library
- Established: January 4, 1905; 121 years ago
- Architects: Orchard, Lansing & Joralemon (A. F. Lansing)

Access and use
- Population served: 24,685

Other information
- Director: Suzanne Renzi-Falge
- Website: flowermemoriallibrary.org
- Roswell P. Flower Memorial Library
- U.S. National Register of Historic Places
- Location within New York
- Location: 229 Washington St., Watertown, New York
- Area: less than one acre
- Architectural style: Late 19th And 20th Century Revivals
- Restored: 2007
- Restored by: BCA Architects & Engineers
- NRHP reference No.: 80002628
- Added to NRHP: January 10, 1980

The Roswell P. Flower Memorial Library is a historic library building located in Watertown in Jefferson County, New York. The library was built in 1903 through 1904, and completed on November 10, 1904. The library opened on January 4, 1905. It was donated to the city by Emma Flower Taylor as a memorial to her father Roswell P. Flower (1835–1899), the 30th governor of New York. A genealogy department, local history collection and meeting rooms are inside the building. It also contains computers available for public use. The library serves as the primary library in Watertown and surrounding communities as a center for reading, culture and research. It was listed on the National Register of Historic Places in 1980.

== History ==
=== Founding ===
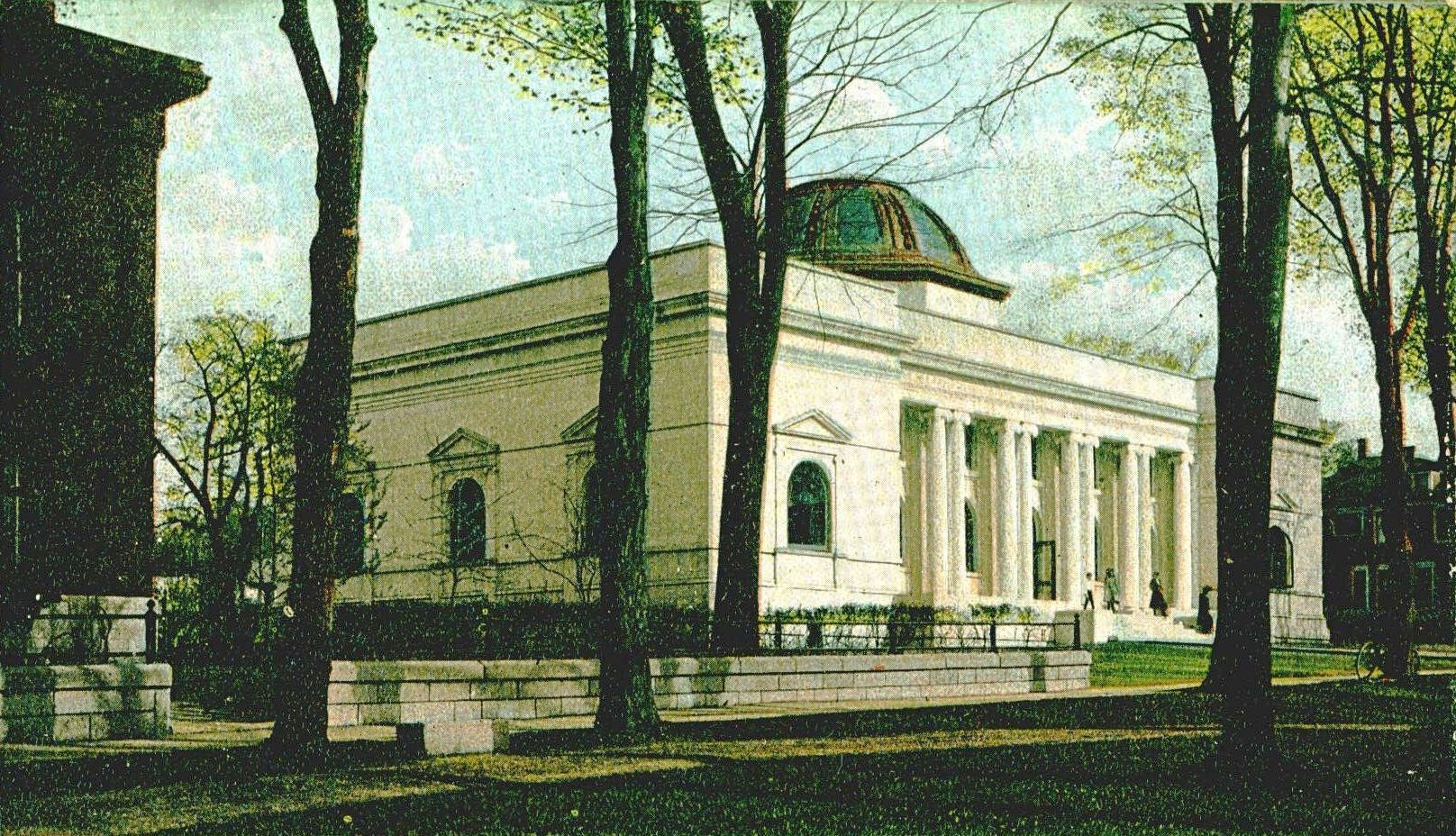
Postcard circa 1907

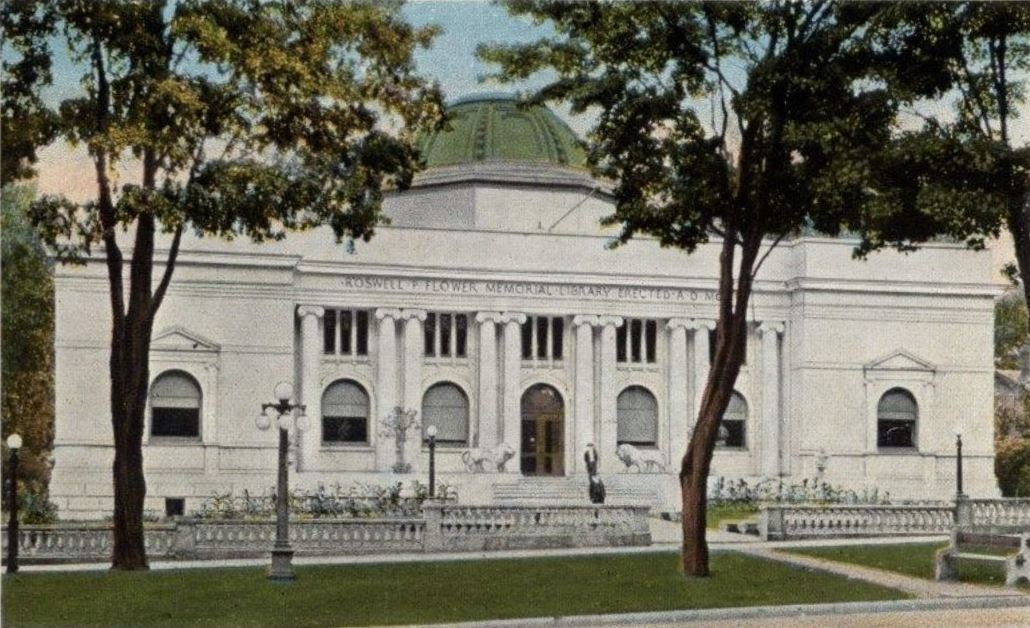
Postcard circa 1929

The Roswell P. Flower Memorial Library was not the first library in Watertown. The Watertown Social Library was created in 1805 and the Watertown Franklin Library stopped functioning in 1834. The Young Men's Association had a library collection, but it was lost to a fire in 1849. In 1890 Watertown had three libraries. These were located in the Watertown High School, St. Joachim's Academy, and the Young Men's Christian Association. Around 1890 Watertown citizens began discussing a public library and applied to the Carnegie Corporation for funding. Living in New York City at the time, Emma Flower Taylor discovered the citizens' wish for a new library. In 1901 she offered to donate the land and fund the building of the library in memory of her father, Roswell P. Flower. On April 8, 1901, her proposal was accepted. The first cornerstone was laid on July 11, 1903, and the library was completed and formally presented to the public on November 10, 1904. The library officially opened on January 4, 1905. The cost of the entire project was $250,000. The library was considered a triumph for Jefferson County as can be seen from this statement from the dedication, "The Flower Memorial Library is unique in that every embellishment is a record of something of importance to Jefferson County. It was a daring thought of the designer to establish such restrictions for artistic inspiration, but the result justifies the idea." The library became known as "the most beautiful small library in the United States". The library was listed on the National Register of Historic Places on January 10, 1980.

=== Modern-day ===
In October 2019 expansion began on the children's room, which added a puppet theater, a costume area, a computer room, and an audio center for listening to audiobooks. For the 100th anniversary of the Kiwanis Club of Watertown, the club donated fifteen thousand dollars (USD) to help fund the expansion.

== Architecture ==
Built in the Grecian style with some Roman features, the library is a two-story, brick, rectangular building faced in marble with a centrally placed octagonal dome. The dome creates a three-story octagonal rotunda, which is the principal interior feature. The main rotunda features bronze zodiac signs inlaid in the marble floor. These signs were done by James C. Kindlund. On the dome above there are four personified figures representing History, Romance, Religion and Science. These are interspersed with more figures personifying Fable, Drama, Lyric and Epic poetry. Each of the figures has the names of two famous individuals who embody that field of knowledge. Fable is surrounded by La Fontaine and Aesop, Religion has St. John and Moses, Lyric has Milton and Virgil, Epic Poetry has Homer and Dante, Science has Darwin and Newton, Drama has Shakespeare and Molière and Romance has Scott and Dumas. The inscription on the frieze under the dome states "To know wisdom and instruction: to perceive the words of understanding". As you enter the library from the front, the words "Salve," Latin for "Welcome" and "Vale," Latin for "Farewell," are inscribed into the marble floor. To the right and left of the rotunda on the first floor are two large reading rooms, as well as two exhibition areas. These display areas showcase antiques featuring local author Marietta Holley, as well as items relating to the French emigres who once lived in the north country. The architects hired for the building were Orchard, Lansing & Joralemon of Niagara Falls, and supervising architect, Mr. A. F. Lansing. The architect of the art was Mr. Charles Rollinson Lamb and the interior decorators were J & R Lamb. One of the unique components of the original library was its separate Children's Room which was set away from the adult areas and was donated by Mrs. Taylor as a way to commemorate her eldest son who died in infancy. A Genealogy department, local history archives and meeting rooms are located in the top floor of the building.

=== Lions ===
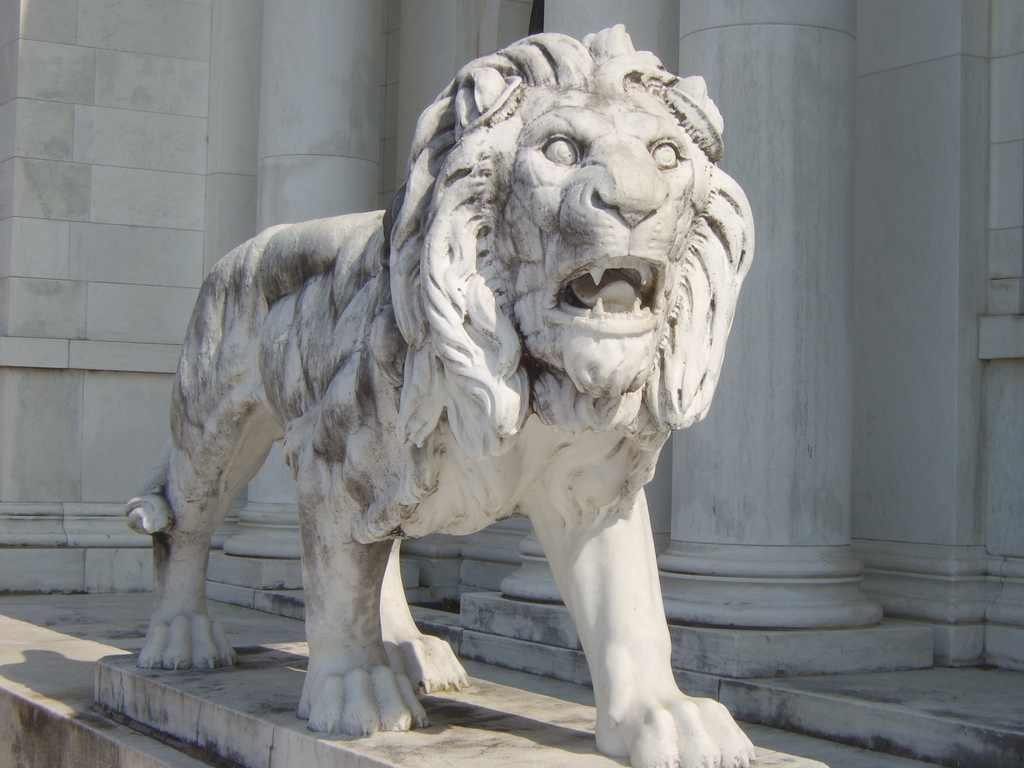
The left lion in the entrance to the library

One of the most prominent details of the library are the two stone lions in front of the library. The lions are not original to the building, they were added in June 1905. The Watertown Herald reported that "The new Flower Library is being further beautified by Mrs. J. B. Taylor. At each side of the front doors and on the front steps, bronze lamps will be placed, while two marble lions will guard the entrance." The two stone lions came from Italy on the order of Emma Flower Taylor. In 1909, One of the lions had a tooth broken off and it was jokingly reported that "the big beast never winced when dentist W. W. Puffer did the job". A lion was damaged in 1925 by a falling maple tree. In 1982, a lion lost his tail when a boy leaned against the lion, which caused the tail to fall onto the library steps and break into several pieces.

== Gallery ==
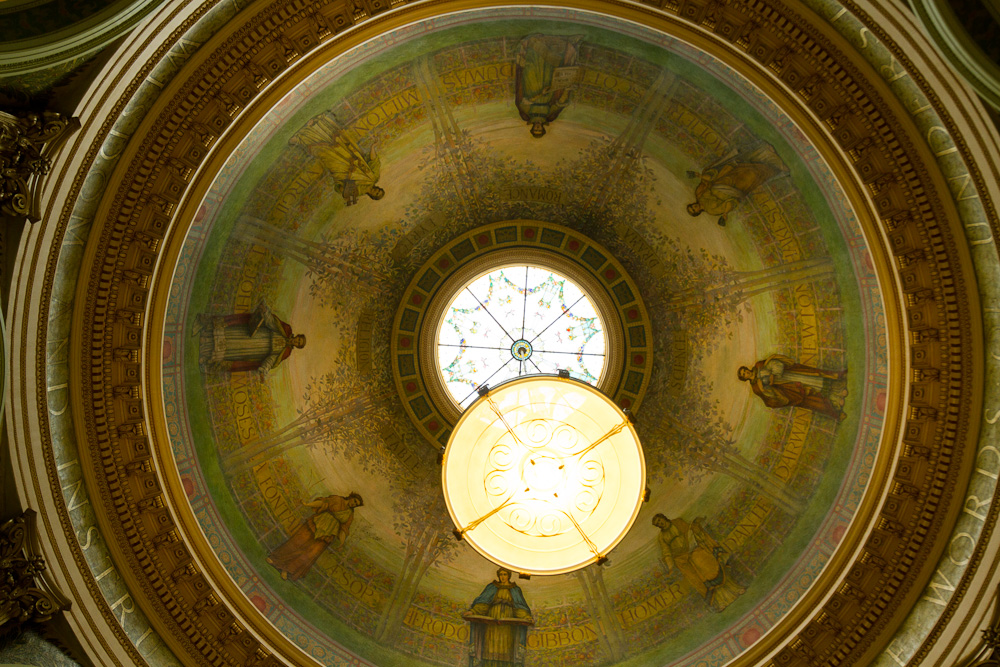
Roswell P. Flower Memorial Library dome murals

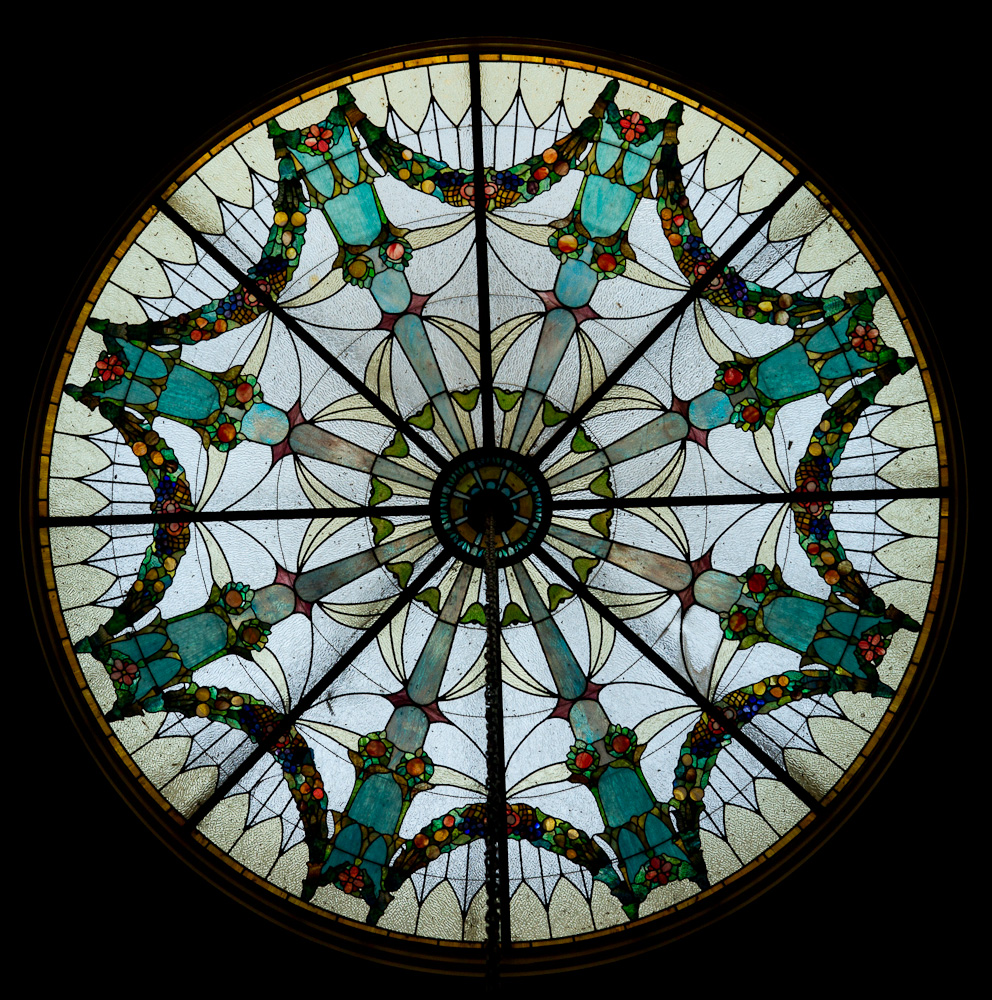
Roswell P. Flower Memorial Library Oculus

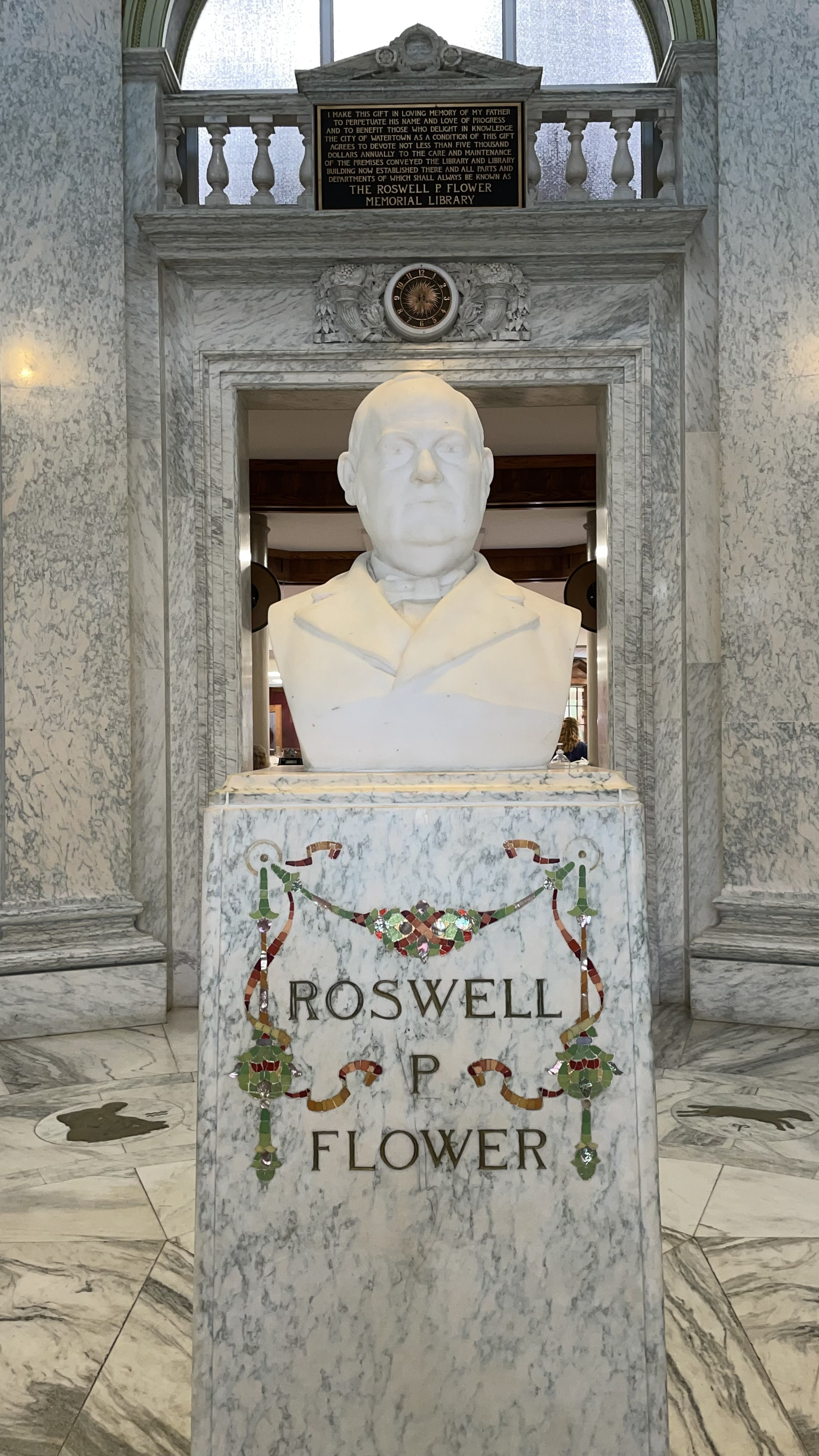
Bust of Roswell P. Flower located inside the library
