= Frank Rice (politician) =

American lawyer and politician

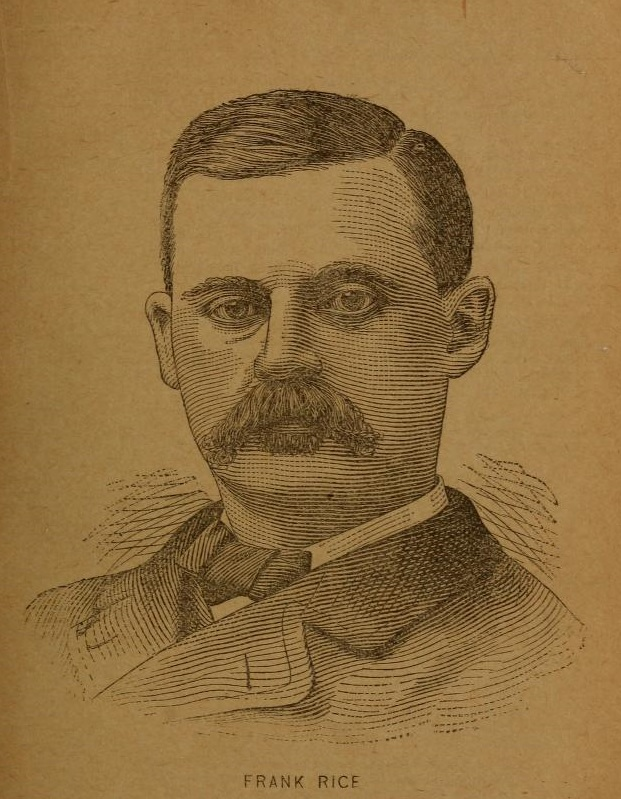
Frank Rice (1891)

Frank Rice (January 15, 1845 – December 5, 1914) was an American lawyer and politician.

== Life ==
He was born on January 15, 1845, in Seneca, Ontario County, New York. He attended Dr. Taylor's private school at Geneva, New York, Geneva Classical and Union School, and Canandaigua Academy. He graduated from Hamilton College in 1868. The following year he began studying law at the firm of Comstock and Bennett in Canandaigua, New York, was admitted to the bar and became a clerk in the surrogate's office in 1870.

He was District Attorney of Ontario County from 1875 to 1881. He was a member of the New York State Assembly (Ontario Co.) in 1883 and 1884; and was Chairman of the Committee on Privileges and Elections in 1883, and Minority Leader in 1884. From 1885 to 1889, he was Judge of the Ontario County Court. He was Secretary of State of New York from 1890 to 1893, elected at the New York state election, 1889 and the New York state election, 1891. He was a delegate to the 1880, 1892 and 1912 Democratic National Conventions.

He died on December 5, 1914, in Canandaigua, New York.

== Sources ==
- Prognosis of election result mentioning earlier defeat of Raines by Rice, in NYT on October 27, 1895
- Bios from History of Ontario County (Conover & Aldrich, 1893, p. 155f), and History of Ontario Co., NY & Its People (1911, Vol. II, p. 332), at usgennet
- Sketches of the Democratic candidates, in NYT on October 2, 1889
- Obit in NYT on December 6, 1914

New York State Assembly
| Preceded by John Raines | New York State Assembly; Ontario County; 1883–1884 | Succeeded by John Raines |
Political offices
| Preceded by Theodore Roosevelt | Minority Leader in the New York State Assembly; 1884 | Succeeded by William Caryl Ely |
| Preceded by Frederick Cook | Secretary of State of New York; 1890–1893 | Succeeded by John Palmer |
