= Simon W. Rosendale =

American lawyer and politician

Simon Wolfe Rosendale
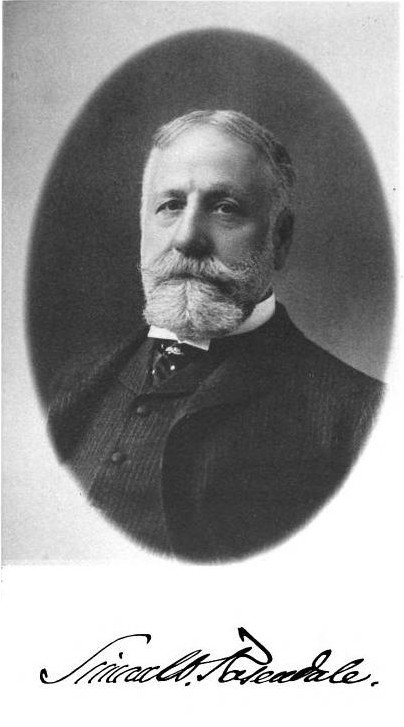
- Born: June 23, 1842; Albany, New York, U.S.
- Died: April 22, 1937 (aged 94); Albany, New York, U.S.

Simon Wolfe Rosendale (June 23, 1842 – April 22, 1937) was an American lawyer and politician. Rosendale was the first Jew elected to a statewide elective office in New York.

== Life ==
He was born on June 23, 1842, in Albany, New York.

He graduated from Barre Academy. Then he studied law at the office of Courtney & Cassidy in Albany. He was admitted to the New York State Bar Association in 1863 and became an assistant district attorney of Albany County, New York. In 1868, he was elected Recorder of Albany and held that office for four years. From 1878 to 1881, he was Corporation Counsel of Albany. In 1881 he formed a partnership with Rufus Wheeler Peckham, and after Peckham's election to the state bench, he continued his law practice with Albert Hessberg.

As a Democrat, he was New York State Attorney General from 1892 to 1893, elected in 1891 but defeated for re-election in 1893.

In 1895, he published The Involution of Wampum as Currency: the Story Told By the Colonial Ordinances of New Netherland, 1641-1662.

Governor Theodore Roosevelt appointed him in 1899 to the State Board of Charities, a post he held for 18 years.

In 1919, he was one of 31 prominent Jews who signed an Anti-Zionist Memorandum given to President Woodrow Wilson, to be presented to the Versailles Peace Conference, stating their opinion against the foundation of a Jewish state in Palestine.

He died on April 22, 1937, in Albany, New York, at age 94.

== Affiliations ==
For ten years was president of the court of appeals of the Order of B'nai B'rith. He was for a number of years a member of the executive board of the Union of American Hebrew Congregations. He was chairman of the convention in Philadelphia in 1888, at which the Jewish Publication Society of America was organized, and was a vice-president of the American Jewish Historical Society.

He was President of the Board of Governors of Union College, President of the Board of Trustees of Albany Medical College, and Governor of the Albany City Hospital.

== See also ==
- List of Jewish American jurists

Legal offices
Preceded by Charles F. Tabor	New York State Attorney General; 1892–1893	Succeeded by Theodore E. Hancock
