= Lawrence J. Fitzgerald =

Lawrence J. Fitzgerald (d. July 12, 1918 Auburn, Cayuga County, New York) was an American businessman and politician.

== Life ==
He was born in Ireland and came to the United States as a boy with his parents. The family settled at Skaneateles, N.Y. Later he moved to Cortland, New York and in 1869, he established the Cortland Wagon Company which manufactured carriages, wagons and bicycles.

He was President of the Village of Cortland in 1882. As a Democrat, he was New York State Treasurer from 1886 to 1889, elected in 1885 and 1887.

In 1906, in opposition to William R. Hearst who had been nominated by the Democratic Party, he supported Republican Charles Evans Hughes for Governor.

He was a vice president of the National Bank of Cortland, and a director of the Madison Square Bank and the Columbia Bank, both in New York City.

== Sources ==
- The Political Graveyard: Index to Politicians: Fitzgerald at politicalgraveyard.com Political Graveyard
- Past and Present - Cortland - Part 2 - Its Manufacturing Interests. at www.usgennet.org History of the Cortland Wagon Co., at USGenNet
- About the Treasurer's office, in NYT on February 3, 1887
- Gubernatorial campaign, in NYT on October 6, 1906
- Obit in NYT on July 13, 1918

Political offices
Preceded by Robert A. Maxwell	New York State Treasurer; 1886–1889	Succeeded by Elliott Danforth
