= Elliot Danforth =

American politician (1850–1906)

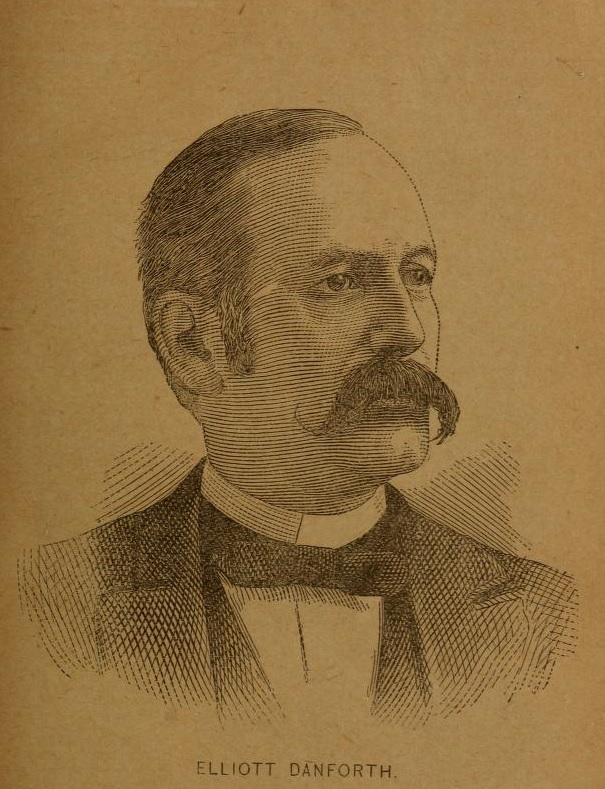

New York State Treasurer
- In office 1890–1893

Personal details
- Born: March 6, 1850 Middleburgh, New York, U.S.
- Died: January 7, 1906 (aged 55) New York, New York, U.S.
- Resting place: Woodlawn Cemetery
- Party: Democratic
- Spouse: Ida Prince (m. 1874)
- Children: 2
- Occupation: Lawyer, politician

Elliot Danforth (March 6, 1850 – January 7, 1906) was an American lawyer and politician.

== Life ==
He was born on March 6, 1850, in Middleburgh, Schoharie County, New York, the son of Peter S. Danforth, a justice of the New York Supreme Court. He studied law with his father and was admitted to the bar in 1872. On December 17, 1874, he married Ida Prince, and they had a son, Edward Danforth, and a daughter. In 1878, he moved to Bainbridge, N.Y., where his father-in-law was President of the First National Bank. There, Danforth practiced law in partnership with George H. Winsor, and was President of the Corporation of Bainbridge.

He was a delegate to the 1880 and 1884, 1888, 1892, 1896, 1900 and 1904 Democratic National Conventions.

He was Deputy Treasurer under Lawrence J. Fitzgerald from 1885 to 1889, and was New York State Treasurer from 1890 to 1893, elected in 1889 and 1891.

In November 1891, he was a member of the State Board of Canvassers (made up by the Secretary of State, Treasurer, Comptroller, Attorney General and State Engineer), when the electoral fraud in the Dutchess County senatorial election happened by which Governor David B. Hill gained control of the New York State Senate. The Republican candidate Gilbert A. Deane had received 78 votes more than Democrat Edward B. Osborne, but the Board changed 92 votes and declared Osborne elected by a plurality of 14. The New York Supreme Court issued a writ to Danforth, ordering him to certify the election of Deane, but Danforth refused to obey. For this he and the other members of the Board were fined $500 by Justice D. Cady Herrick. The sentence was later upheld by the New York Court of Appeals.

In August 1893, it became known that Danforth had received a loan of $50,000 (about seven times the annual salary of the Treasurer) from the Madison Square Bank in New York City in exchange for keeping a large amount of State monies in that bank. Danforth managed to withdraw the State's $250,000 from the bank in the early hours of August 9, the day the bank (of which Fitzgerald was a director) closed.

After leaving the Treasury, he resumed the practice of law at New York City. From 1896 to 1898, he was Chairman of the New York State Democratic Committee, and in 1897 campaigned successfully for the election of Alton B. Parker as Chief Judge of the New York Court of Appeals. In 1898, he ran for Lieutenant Governor of New York with Augustus Van Wyck but they were narrowly defeated by Theodore Roosevelt and Timothy L. Woodruff.

He died on January 7, 1906, at his home at 51, East 58th Street in Manhattan, of pneumonia, and was buried at Woodlawn Cemetery in The Bronx.

Political offices
Preceded by Lawrence J. Fitzgerald	New York State Treasurer; 1890–1893	Succeeded by Addison B. Colvin
Party political offices
Preceded by James W. Hinckley	New York State Democratic Committee Chairman; September 1896 – September 1898	Succeeded by Frank Campbell
Preceded by Frederick C. Schraub	Democratic nominee for Lieutenant Governor of New York; 1898	Succeeded by William F. Mackey
