= Thaddeus B. Wakeman =

American philosopher

Thaddeus B. Wakeman, also known as T.B. Wakeman, was an American attorney, politician, editor and political philosopher. He graduated from Princeton University. Generally ascribed as a liberal freethought philosopher, he was a speaker at the 1878 Freethinkers' Convention at Watkins, New York. He served as president of the National Liberal League, ran unsuccessfully for Attorney General in the New York state election of 1887, and was editor of the liberal paper Man. He was also the head of the Liberal University of Oregon, later relocated to Kansas City, Missouri.

His daughter Emily Wakeman Hartley founded and managed the Stamford Theatre in Stamford, Connecticut.
