= Roswell P. Flower =

American politician and governor (1835–1899)

Roswell Pettibone Flower
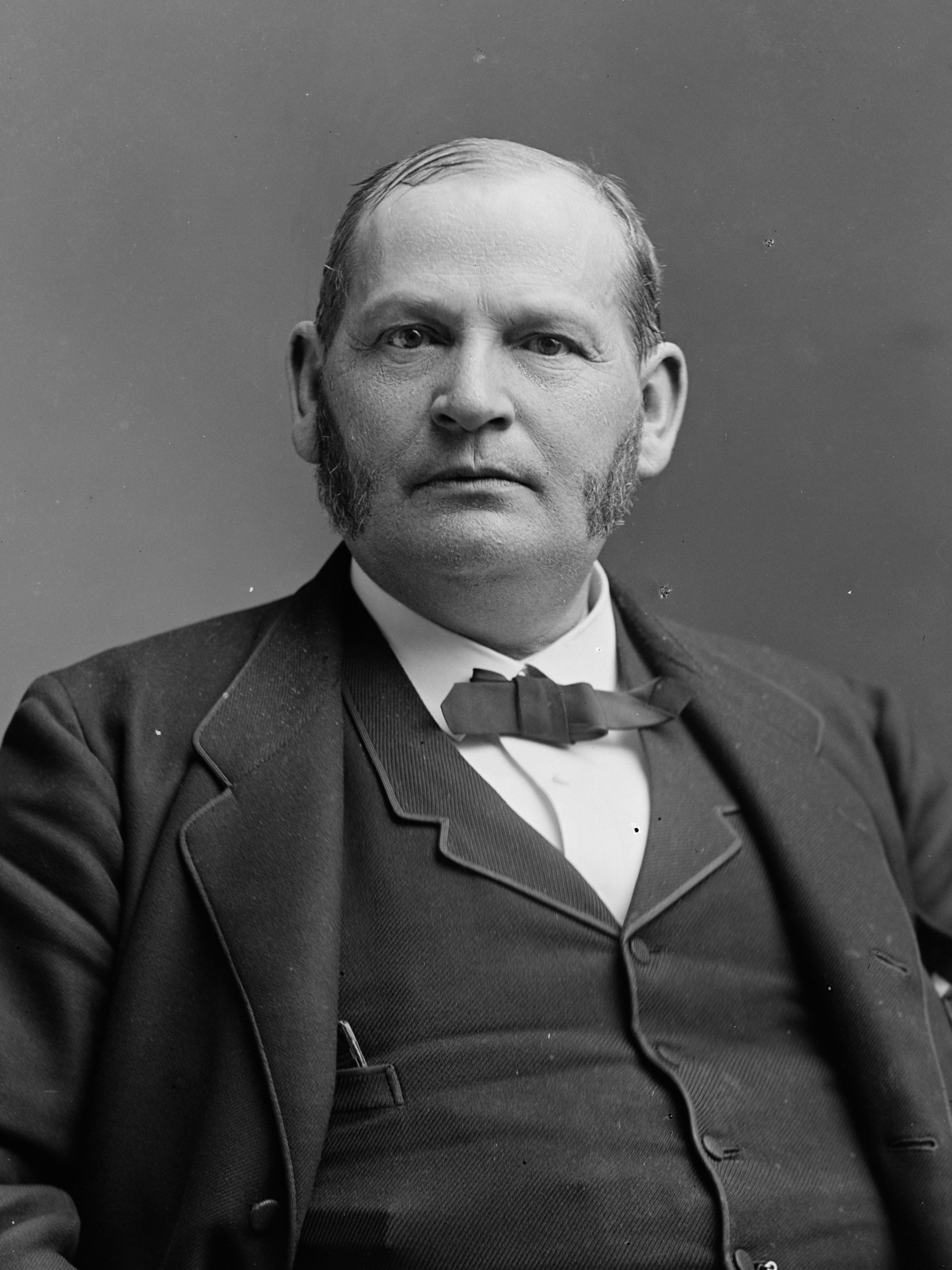
- Flower, 1881–1890

30th Governor of New York
- In office January 1, 1892 – December 31, 1894
- Lieutenant: William F. Sheehan
- Preceded by: David B. Hill
- Succeeded by: Levi P. Morton

Member of the U.S. House of Representatives from New York
- In office March 4, 1889 – September 16, 1891
- Preceded by: William B. Cockran
- Succeeded by: Joseph J. Little
- Constituency: 12th district
- In office November 8, 1881 – March 3, 1883
- Preceded by: Levi P. Morton
- Succeeded by: Orlando B. Potter
- Constituency: 11th district

Personal details
- Born: August 7, 1835 Theresa, New York, U.S.
- Died: May 12, 1899 (aged 63) Eastport, New York, U.S.
- Party: Democratic
- Parent(s): Mary Ann and Nathan Monroe Flower
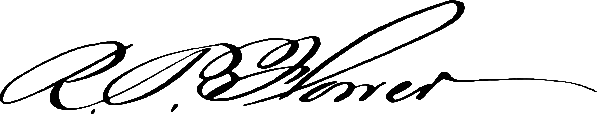
- Signature

Roswell Pettibone Flower (August 7, 1835 – May 12, 1899) was an American politician who served as the 30th governor of New York from 1892 to 1894. He also served two terms in the U.S. House of Representatives from 1881 to 1883 (NY-11) and from 1889 to 1891 (NY-12).

== Biography ==
He was born on August 7, 1835, to Nathan Monroe Flower and Mary Ann Flower, the sixth of nine children. As a youth, he worked in odd jobs, which enabled him to cover the cost of his education at a local village school. He graduated from high school in 1851, and for a short period thereafter he worked as a teacher in a district school.

In 1853, he became Deputy Postmaster of Watertown, New York, at a salary of $600 a year, and after six years had saved $1,000 and opened with a partner a jewelry store. Two years later, he bought his partner out and continued in this business until 1869.

In 1869, Henry Keep, a former President of the New York Central Railroad, was dying and asked Roswell Flower, whose wife was a sister of Keep's wife Emma, to manage the $4,000,000 estate for his widow. Flower asked Keep for guidance on who he could trust and named a business associate, Daniel Drew. Keep replied, "He is as honest a man as there is in the State of New York, but for fear that somebody else will cheat, he will always begin first." The business brought Flower to New York City where he became known as a shrewd financial administrator and opened the banking house of R. P. Flower & Co.

He was elected as a Democrat to the 47th United States Congress to fill the vacancy caused by the resignation of Levi P. Morton upon his appointment as Minister to France, and served from November 8, 1881, to March 3, 1883. He was also elected to the 51st and 52nd United States Congresses, and served from March 4, 1889, to September 16, 1891, when he resigned upon his nomination for governor.

He was Governor of New York from 1892 to 1894, elected in 1891, the last one to serve a three-year term. During his term, he signed into law the creation of the City of Niagara Falls.

In the years after his term as governor, Flower gained a reputation as a canny investor and attracted the attention of traders and investors from all over the United States. As a result of this strong following, Flower possessed an extraordinary capability to influence market sentiment. His aggressive move on Brooklyn Rapid Transit drove the share price of this company from $6 to over $130 a share in a relatively short period of time. The dramatic rise of this stock was widely credited with triggering the bull market that ran from 1898 to 1899.

Flower was Chairman of the Cornell University Board of Trustees from 1897 to his death in 1899.

Flower was president of the New York State Agricultural Society in 1899.

He died of a heart attack on May 12, 1899, in Eastport, New York, at the Long Island Country Clubhouse. His death disrupted the planned purchase by a consortium of investors, including Flower and William Henry Moore, of the steel-related holdings of Andrew Carnegie about a year and a half before J. P. Morgan purchased the same interests in the deal that formed U.S. Steel.

== Legacy ==
A monument to Flower, designed by noted sculptor Augustus Saint-Gaudens in 1902, is located on lower Washington Street at Watertown. It is in the Public Square Historic District, listed on the National Register of Historic Places in 1984. The Roswell P. Flower Memorial Library was built in 1903–04 as a memorial to Flower. It was listed on the National Register of Historic Places in 1980.

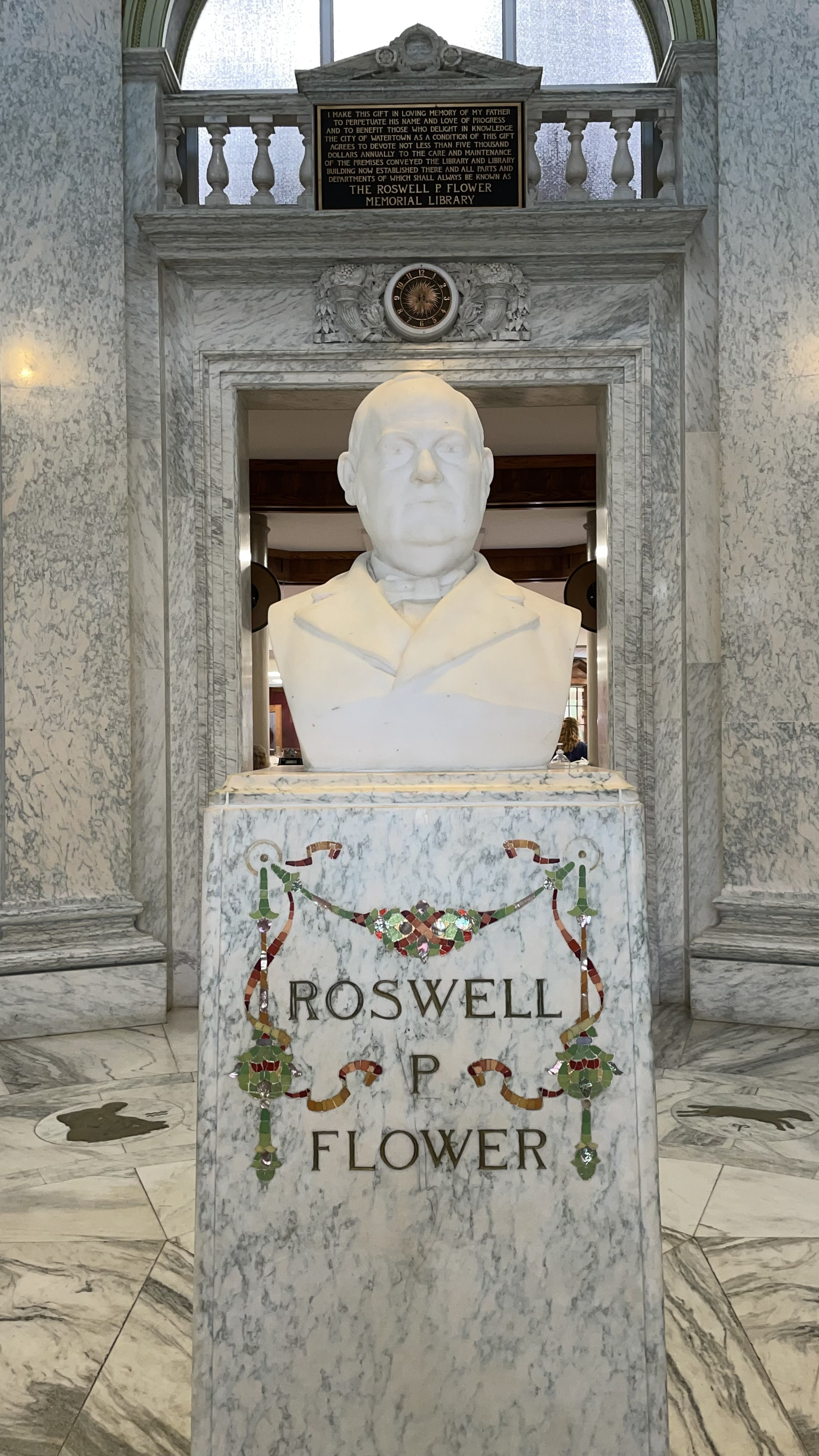
Bust of Flower in the Roswell P. Flower Memorial Library

Party political offices
| Preceded by David B. Hill | Democratic nominee for Governor of New York; 1891 | Succeeded by David B. Hill |
U.S. House of Representatives
| Preceded by Levi P. Morton | Member of the U.S. House of Representatives from New York's 11th congressional district 1881–1883 | Succeeded by Orlando B. Potter |
| Preceded by William Bourke Cockran | Member of the U.S. House of Representatives from New York's 12th congressional district 1889–1891 | Succeeded by Joseph J. Little |
Political offices
| Preceded by David B. Hill | Governor of New York; 1892–1894 | Succeeded by Levi P. Morton |
Academic offices
| Preceded by Henry W. Sage | Chairman of Cornell Board of Trustees; 1897–1899 | Succeeded by Frank H. Hiscock |
