= New York State Treasurer =

Position in the U.S. state of New York

The New York State Treasurer was a state cabinet officer in the State of New York between 1776 and 1926. During the re-organization of the state government under Governor Al Smith, the office was abolished and its responsibilities transferred to the new Department of Audit and Control headed to the New York State Comptroller.

== History ==
In 1776, the New York Provincial Congress appointed Peter Van Brugh Livingston Treasurer to disburse the monies raised and issued in the revolutionary operations of the day.

After the establishment of the state government, the Treasurer was appointed by special act of the New York State Legislature for short periods.

Under the New York State Constitution of 1821, the Treasurer was elected by joint ballot of the State Legislature.

Under the Constitution of 1846, the office became elective by general election, and the Treasurer was elected with the other state cabinet officers in odd years to a two-year term, serving in the second year of the governor in office and the first year of the succeeding governor. The Treasurer was elected in 1895 to a three-year term, and subsequently was elected in even years and served a two-year term concurrently with the governor until the end of 1926.

== New York State Treasurers ==
Image	Name	Took office	Left office	Party	Notes
	Peter Van Brugh Livingston	1776	1778		appointed by Provincial Congress
	Gerard Bancker	April 1, 1778	1798		
	Robert McClellan	March 16, 1798	January 31, 1803	Federalist	resigned after defalcation
	Abraham G. Lansing	February 8, 1803	February 5, 1808	Dem.-Rep./Lewisite	
	David Thomas	February 5, 1808	February 8, 1810	Dem.-Rep./Clintonian	
	Abraham G. Lansing	February 8, 1810	February 18, 1812	Federalist	
	David Thomas	February 18, 1812	February 10, 1813	Dem.-Rep.	
	Charles Z. Platt	February 10, 1813	February 12, 1817	Federalist	
	Gerrit L. Dox	February 12, 1817	January 29, 1821	Dem.-Rep.	
	Benjamin Knower	January 29, 1821	November 3, 1824	Dem.-Rep./Bucktail	resigned
	Abraham Keyser, Jr.	November 3, 1824	February 16, 1825	Dem.-Rep./Bucktail	
	Gamaliel H. Barstow	February 16, 1825	February 14, 1826	Dem.-Rep./Clintonian	
	Abraham Keyser, Jr.	February 14, 1826	February 5, 1838	D-R/Buckt.-Jacksonian-Dem.	
	Gamaliel H. Barstow	February 5, 1838	February 4, 1839	Whig	resigned
	Jacob Haight	February 4, 1839	February 7, 1842	Whig	
	Thomas Farrington	February 7, 1842	February 3, 1845	Dem./Barnburner	
	Benjamin Enos	February 3, 1845	February 2, 1846	Dem./Hunker	
	Thomas Farrington	February 2, 1846	December 31, 1847	Dem./Barnburner	legislated out of office by the Constitution of 1846
	Alvah Hunt	January 1, 1848	December 31, 1851	Whig	first Treasurer elected by general ballot, two terms
	James M. Cook	January 1, 1852	November 20, 1852	Whig	election contested by Democratic candidate
	Benjamin Welch, Jr.	November 20, 1852	December 31, 1853	Democratic	declared elected by the New York Supreme Court, and took office for the remainder of the term
	Elbridge G. Spaulding	January 1, 1854	December 31, 1855	Whig	
	Stephen Clark	January 1, 1856	December 31, 1857	American	
	Isaac V. Vanderpoel	January 1, 1858	December 31, 1859	Democratic	
	Philip Dorsheimer	January 1, 1860	December 31, 1861	Republican	
	William B. Lewis	January 1, 1862	December 31, 1863	Union	
	George W. Schuyler	January 1, 1864	December 31, 1865	Union	
	Joseph Howland	January 1, 1866	December 31, 1867	Republican	
	Wheeler H. Bristol	January 1, 1868	December 31, 1871	Democratic	two terms
	Thomas Raines	January 1, 1872	June 1, 1874	Republican	became a Liberal Republican in 1872, and was re-elected on Democratic ticket, declared incapacitated after nervous breakdown
	Abraham Lansing	June 1, 1874	August 17, 1874	Democratic	temporarily appointed during illness of Raines
	Thomas Raines	August 19, 1874	December 31, 1875	Democratic	reinstated after recovering his mental health
	Charles N. Ross	January 1, 1876	December 31, 1877	Democratic	
	James Mackin	January 1, 1878	December 31, 1879	Democratic	
	Nathan D. Wendell	January 1, 1880	December 31, 1881	Republican	
	Robert A. Maxwell	January 1, 1882	December 31, 1885	Democratic	two terms
	Lawrence J. Fitzgerald	January 1, 1886	December 31, 1889	Democratic	two terms
	Elliot Danforth	January 1, 1890	December 31, 1893	Democratic	two terms
	Addison B. Colvin	January 1, 1894	December 31, 1898	Republican	two terms (1894-95, 1896-98)
	John P. Jaeckel	January 1, 1899	December 31, 1902	Republican	two terms
	John G. Wickser	January 1, 1903	December 31, 1904	Republican	
	John G. Wallenmeier, Jr.	January 1, 1905	December 31, 1906	Republican	
	Julius Hauser	January 1, 1907	December 31, 1908	Dem./Ind. League	
	Thomas B. Dunn	January 1, 1909	December 31, 1910	Republican	
	John J. Kennedy	January 1, 1911	February 15, 1914	Democratic	committed suicide during his second term
	George W. Batten	February 15, 1914	February 25, 1914	Democratic	as Deputy Treasurer acted until the election of a successor
	Homer D. Call	February 25, 1914	December 31, 1914	Progressive/Dem.	elected by State Legislature to fill unexpired term
	James L. Wells	January 1, 1915	December 31, 1920	Republican	three terms
	N. Monroe Marshall	January 1, 1921	December 31, 1922	Republican	
	George K. Shuler	January 1, 1923	December 31, 1924	Democratic	
	Lewis H. Pounds	January 1, 1925	December 31, 1926	Republican	last Treasurer, department merged into Comptroller's office
