= Louis F. Payn =

American businessman and politician

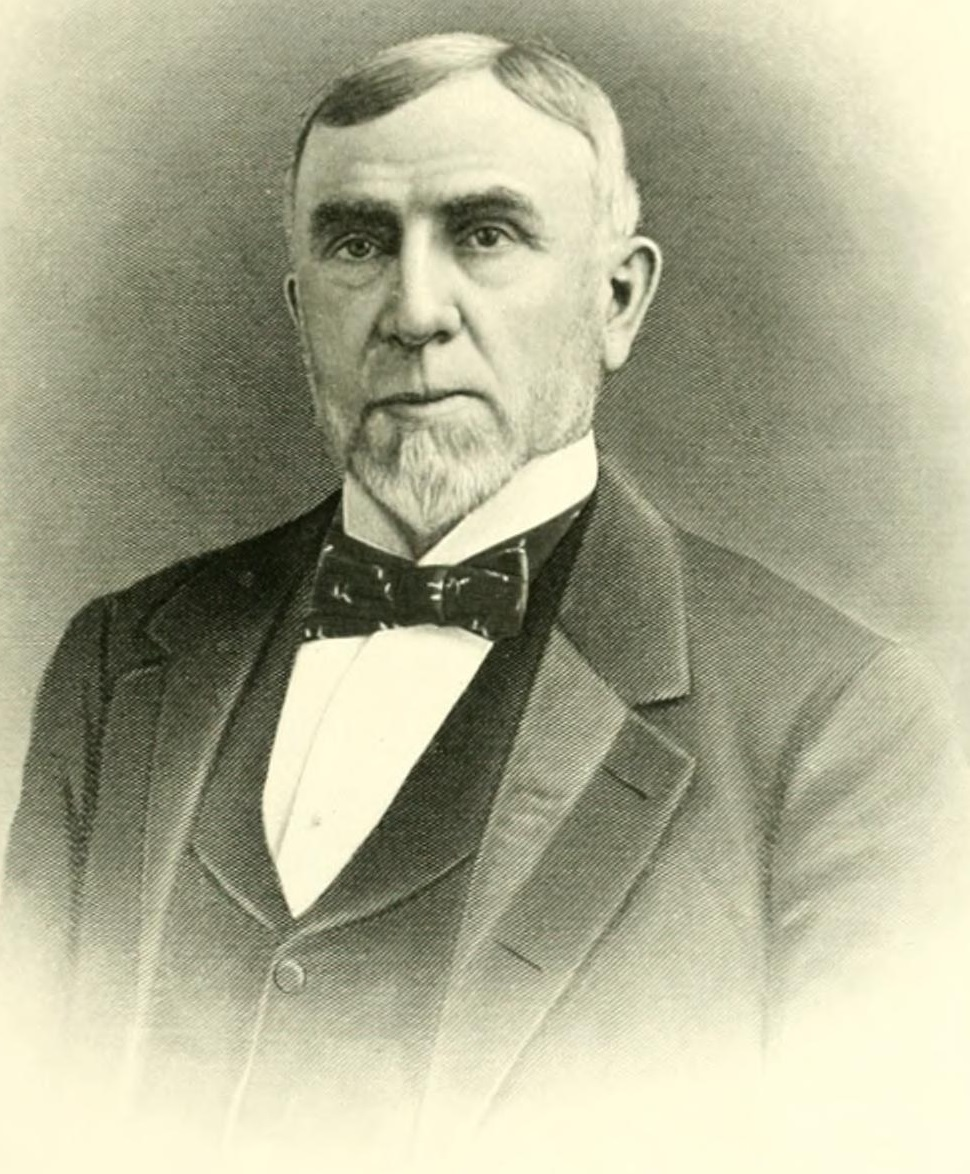
- From Volume III (1902) of New York State's Prominent and Progressive Men

Superintendent of the New York State Department of Insurance
- In office February 11, 1897 – February 1, 1900
- Preceded by: James F. Pierce
- Succeeded by: Francis Hendricks

United States Marshal for the Southern District of New York
- In office February 27, 1877 – May 23, 1881
- Preceded by: Oliver Fiske
- Succeeded by: Henry E. Knox

Personal details
- Born: January 27, 1835 Ghent, New York
- Died: March 19, 1923 (aged 88) Chatham, New York
- Resting place: Chatham Rural Cemetery, Chatham, New York
- Party: Republican
- Spouse(s): Margaret Stafford (m. 1857-1898, her death); Marion K. Heath (m. 1900-1923, his death)
- Children: 2
- Profession: Businessman

Louis Frisbie Payn (January 27, 1835 – March 19, 1923) was an American manufacturer and politician from New York. A Republican, he was most prominent for serving as United States Marshal for the Southern District of New York from 1887 to 1881 and Superintendent of the New York State Insurance Department from 1897 to 1900.

A native of Ghent, New York, Payn was educated in the schools of Columbia County and went into the papermaking business in Chatham. Payn's venture proved successful and he became wealthy as he expanded his holdings into oil production, mining, real estate, and insurance.

A Republican, Payn gained a reputation as a behind the scenes insider who wielded substantial influence in the New York Republican Party's inner circles. A delegate to numerous state and national conventions, Payn became an ally of state party boss Roscoe Conkling and Conkling's successor Thomas C. Platt. He served as Marshal for New York's Southern District from 1887 to 1881. A longtime friend of Frank S. Black, Payn played a leading role in Black's election to the United States House of Representatives in 1894 and Governor of New York in 1896. In 1897, Black appointed Payn Superintendent of the New York State Insurance Department. Good government advocates who advocated civil service reform protested the selection because they regarded Payn as a corrupt associate of Platt. When Theodore Roosevelt succeeded Black as governor, he refused to reappoint Payn, which triggered a feud with Platt. The issue was resolved when Roosevelt appointed a different candidate who was acceptable to Platt.

After leaving the superintendent's position, Payn returned to his business interests. In retirement, he turned to philanthropy and made numerous donations to benefit Chatham and the surrounding area. Payn died in Chatham on March 19, 1923. He was buried at Chatham Rural Cemetery in Chatham.

== Early life ==
Payn was born in Ghent, New York on January 27, 1835, the son of Judge Elijah Payn and Rachel Dunspaugh. His father was a lawyer in the village of Chatham. The Payns moved to Hudson when Payn was a boy, and his father served as surrogate judge of Columbia County, city recorder, and city police court justice. Louis Payn was educated in the schools of Columbia County and spent several months working in his father's law office. He soon became interested in paper manufacturing, and he worked for several employers until 1872, when he went into business by constructing a paper mill in the town of Chatham.

== Start of career ==
Payn's mill originally made straw paper, and in 1890 Payn added new machinery that manufactured boxboard. This venture proved successful, and Payn's business interests grew to include manufacturing in New York, oil development in West Virginia, and silver mining in Colorado. He was president of Stony Brook Box Board Mills and the Louis F. Payn Company of West Virginia. He was also president of the Chatham Land Company, and a director of the Chatham Mutual Fire Insurance Company. Payn was also involved in civic and charitable causes, including service as president of the Columbia County Agricultural Society. He was a pew holder in the Chatham Reformed Church for nearly half a century and was also a member of the Freemasons.

In January 1856, the newly-elected Republican sheriff of Columbia County intended to appoint Payn a deputy sheriff, but had to wait until the end of the month because Payn had not yet reached the minimum required age of 21. Payn became active in politics as a Republican, and in 1867 Governor Reuben Fenton appointed Payn as harbor master of the Port of New York. Payn in turn supported Fenton when Fenton ran for the U.S. Senate in 1869. Payn served as harbor master until newly elected governor John T. Hoffman replaced him with a Democrat. In 1872, Payn broke with Fenton because Fenton abandoned the regular Republican Party to support the presidential campaign of Horace Greeley, the nominee of the Liberal Republicans and Democrats.

Payn's first vote for President was for John C. Frémont in 1856. In 1860, he supported Abraham Lincoln for President over William H. Seward. He attended the 1864 Republican National Convention but was not a delegate; he was a delegate to every Republican National Convention from 1868 to 1920.

== Continued career ==
During the Republican Party's feud between the Stalwart followers Roscoe Conkling and the Half-Breed supporters of James G. Blaine, Payn did not initially identify himself as a member of either faction, though he did support Conkling's unsuccessful bid for president at the 1876 Republican National Convention. In 1876, President Ulysses S. Grant, a Conkling ally, appointed Payn United States Marshal for the Southern District of New York. The appointment was confirmed in February 1877, and he served until his term expired in March 1881. He was renominated by President James A. Garfield, and served as acting marshal pending U.S. Senate confirmation, but because of his support for Conkling and Senator Thomas C. Platt in their fight with Garfield over federal patronage in New York, Garfield withdrew the nomination and named Henry E. Knox as Payn's successor.

At the 1880 Republican National Convention, Payn was one of the 306 delegates who followed Conkling for 36 ballots in supporting Ulysses S. Grant's unsuccessful bid for a third term as president. The protracted nomination fight was won by Garfield, who went on to win the general election and take office in March 1881.

Payn supported Senators Conkling and Platt when they resigned in 1881 to protest Garfield's decisions with respect to federal patronage appointments in New York. They quit their Senate seats in the belief that the New York State Legislature would strengthen their position against Garfield by quickly re-electing them, and Payn presented their letters of resignation to Governor Alonzo B. Cornell. After a prolonged deadlock, the legislature resolved the dispute by electing Republican replacements for Conkling and Platt.

After Cornell left the governorship at the end of 1882, he went into business with Payn, and they shared an office in New York City. Among their ventures were tin mining in Harney's Peak, South Dakota and the Wyoming & Dakota Western Railroad Company.

== State Insurance Superintendent ==
Payn was a close friend of Frank S. Black. In 1894, Payn helped Black win election to Congress. In 1896, he helped Black win the Republican nomination for governor, and campaigned for him in his successful general election effort. Payn was regarded as a corrupt associate of Thomas Platt, by now the boss of New York State's Republican Party. Black won, and in February 1897, he appointed Payn Superintendent of the New York State Insurance Department. He served as Superintendent until 1900.

The Payn appointment was controversial because of his ties to Platt, but Black insisted on it. When Theodore Roosevelt succeeded Black as governor, he refused to re-nominate Payn, which sparked a feud with Platt. Platt eventually acquiesced, and a successor took office. In order to maintain Platt's hold on the state Republican party, Platt and Payn helped arrange Roosevelt's removal from New York politics by successfully promoting him for vice president in 1900.

== Death and burial ==
Payn died at home from bronchial pneumonia on March 19, 1923. He was buried at Chatham Rural Cemetery.

== Family ==
In 1857, Payn married Margaret Stafford, a niece of General William J. Worth. She died in 1898. In 1900, he married Marion K. Heath (d. 1924) of Albany. With his first wife, Payn was the father of two children, son Elijah (1860-1940) and daughter Mary (d. 1934), who was the wife of first Azra Chase Haynor, and then Charles Henry Cooke.

== Legacy ==
Payn provided for the creation of a charitable foundation that would commence operations after his second wife's death. Following Marion Heath Payn's death in 1924, the Louis F. Payn Foundation began construction of a retirement residence for senior citizens from the Chatham area. The foundation and the Payn home have continued to operate in Chatham since 1929.

After Marion Heath Payn's death, her estate created the Marion Heath Payn Scholarship. This scholarship, which is awarded annually, is intended to benefit graduating seniors at Chatham High School.

Political offices
Preceded by James F. Pierce	New York Superintendent of Insurance; 1897–1900	Succeeded by Francis Hendricks
