= William Hotchkiss =

William Hotchkiss may refer to:

- William O. Hotchkiss, president of Michigan Technological University and president of Rensselaer Polytechnic Institute
- William Hotchkiss III, Philippine Air Force general
- William Horace Hotchkiss, author of legal textbooks on bankruptcy law
