= Charles Delemere Haines =

American politician (1856–1929)

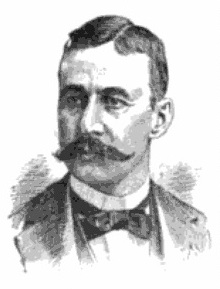

Member of the U.S. House of Representatives from New York's 19th district
- In office March 4, 1893 – March 3, 1895
- Preceded by: Charles Tracey
- Succeeded by: Frank S. Black

Personal details
- Born: June 9, 1856 Medusa, New York, US
- Died: April 11, 1929 (aged 72) Altamonte Springs, Florida, US
- Resting place: Hudson Falls Cemetery, Hudson Falls, New York
- Party: Democratic
- Spouse: Katherine L. (died March 2, 1932)
- Children: Benjamin F. Haines (Step son)

Charles Delemere Haines (June 9, 1856 – April 11, 1929) was an American businessman and member of the United States Congress from New York, serving one term from 1893 to 1895.

== Birth and early life ==
Haines was born in Medusa, New York. His parents, David Tompkins Haines and Emma De Maugh Haines, were prominent in Albany County, and Governor Daniel Tompkins was of this family. He moved with his parents to Coxsackie, where he attended the common schools.

== Early business career ==
Starting as a telegrapher at age 16, he rapidly became a train dispatcher, assistant superintendent, superintendent and owner of railroads.

== Business ventures ==
He moved to Kinderhook, New York in 1888 and built the Kinderhook & Hudson Railroad. In 1913, Haines joined with his brothers in the building and operation of numerous railroad lines; they built and managed eighteen steam railroads and sixteen street railways in fifteen states, Canada and Mexico.

== Public office ==
He was elected as a Democrat to the 53rd United States Congress (March 4, 1893 – March 3, 1895). He was unsuccessful in his bid for reelection in 1894 and resumed his former business activities.

== Royal Fern Corporation ==
Having first come to Altamonte Springs, Florida in 1913 for his health, Haines soon purchased property on the west side of Lake Orienta and began growing asparagus plumosa ferns shortly after World War I. By the early 1920s he was shipping ferns to all parts of the United States via the Atlantic Coast Line Railroad. His Royal Fern Corporation was chartered in 1922 with an authorized capital of $450,000. Haines was the major stockholder with three hundred shares, but George Kingsley, the secretary/treasurer, was also a substantial investor with one hundred forty-five shares. Vice-president James A Cotting of Winter Park owned five shares. Ed W. Mitchell was general manager. With thirty-three acres in production at the time of its incorporation, the firm expanded until it was cultivating sixty-five acres by 1925. Since much of the area was under slat-roof covering to protect the tender plants, one over-enthusiastic reporter called it the largest industry in the world under one roof. The fernery had thirty miles of irrigation pipe, a pre-cooling plant, and its own electric light and water system. There was a complete company town with forty homes for employees, a commissary, a church, a school, a park, and a moving picture theater adjacent to the fernery. The Royal Fernery was the catalyst which made Altamonte Springs a center for fern growing for many years.

In Altamonte Springs, Haines entertained a number of national dignitaries with whom he had become acquainted during his long business and political career. One of his most famous visitors was William Jennings Bryan who was living in Miami during the early 1920s. Bryan may influenced Haines in developing his ideas about the National Newspapermen's Home which he attempted to bring to Altamonte Springs.

== Death ==
Haines resided at Altamonte Springs, Florida, until his death there April 11, 1929.

U.S. House of Representatives
Preceded by Charles Tracey	Member of the U.S. House of Representatives from New York's 19th congressional district March 4, 1893 – March 3, 1895	Succeeded by Frank S. Black
