= 1904 Republican National Convention =

American political convention

- 1904 presidential election
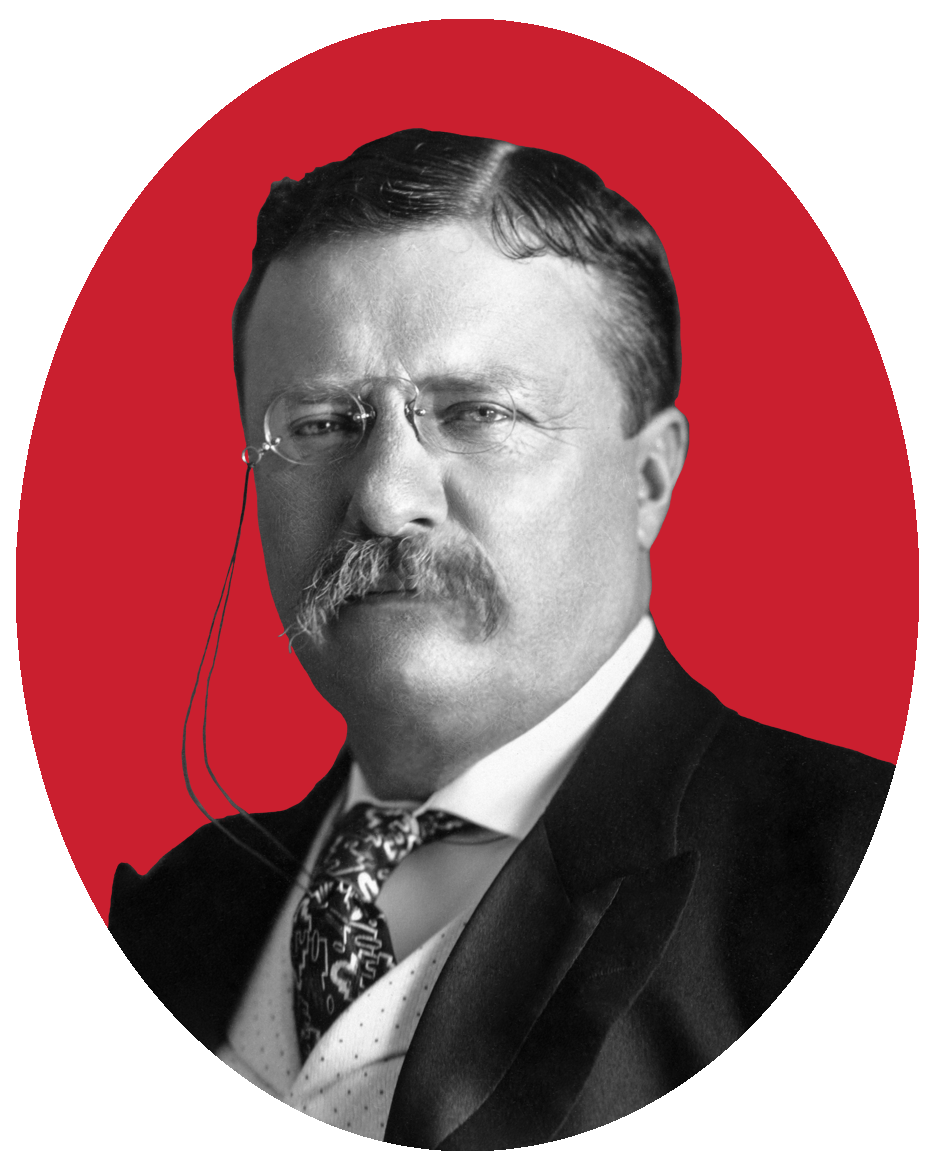
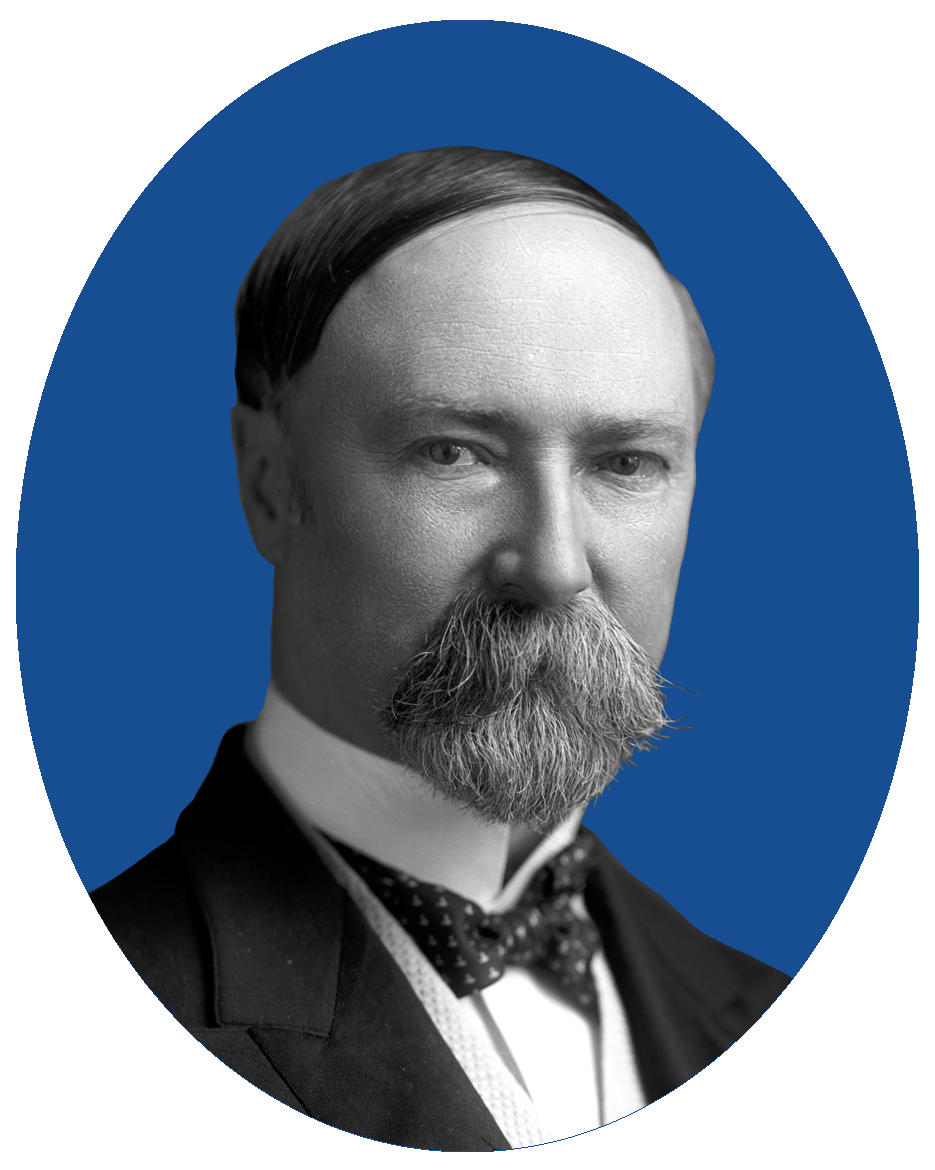
- Nominees; Roosevelt and Fairbanks

Convention
- Dates: June 21–23, 1904
- City: Chicago, Illinois
- Venue: Chicago Coliseum
- Chair: Joseph G. Cannon
- Keynote speaker: Elihu Root

Candidates
- Presidential nominee: Theodore Roosevelt of New York
- Vice-presidential nominee: Charles W. Fairbanks of Indiana
- Other candidates: Mark Hanna

Voting
- Total delegates: 994
- Votes needed for nomination: 498
- Results (president): Theodore Roosevelt (NY): 994 (100%)
- Ballots: 1

The 1904 Republican National Convention was held in the Chicago Coliseum, Chicago, Cook County, Illinois, on June 21 to June 23, 1904.

The popular President Theodore Roosevelt had easily ensured himself of the nomination; a threat had come from the Old Guard favourite Ohio Senator Mark Hanna, the loyal kingmaker in Republican politics, but he died early in 1904, which ended any opposition to Roosevelt within the Republican Party.

There were also very informal talks with future president William Howard Taft about trying for the nomination, but Taft refused these motions as evidenced by a letter to Henry Hoyt, the Solicitor General, in 1903.

Roosevelt was nominated by 994 votes to none, while the only other serious opponent to Roosevelt, Indiana Senator Charles W. Fairbanks, was nominated for vice president by acclaimation.

== Convention ==
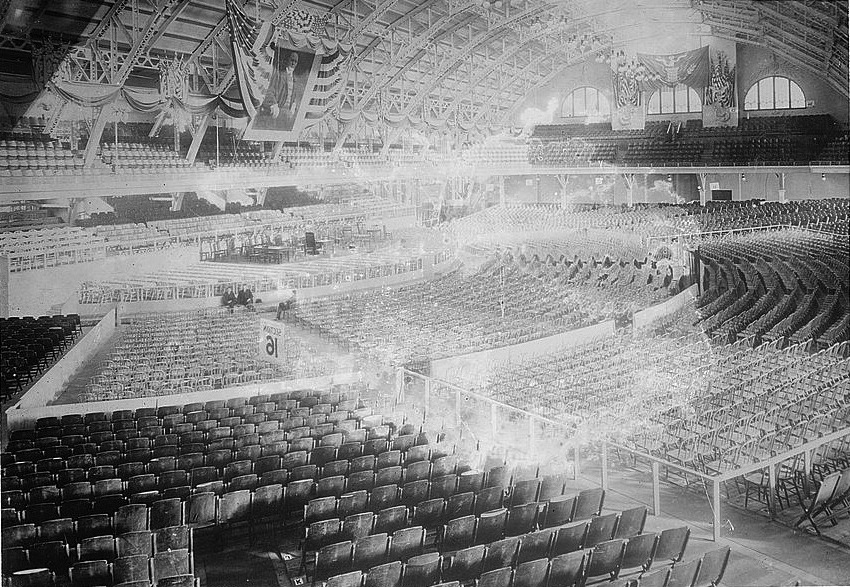
Chicago Coliseum ahead of the Convention

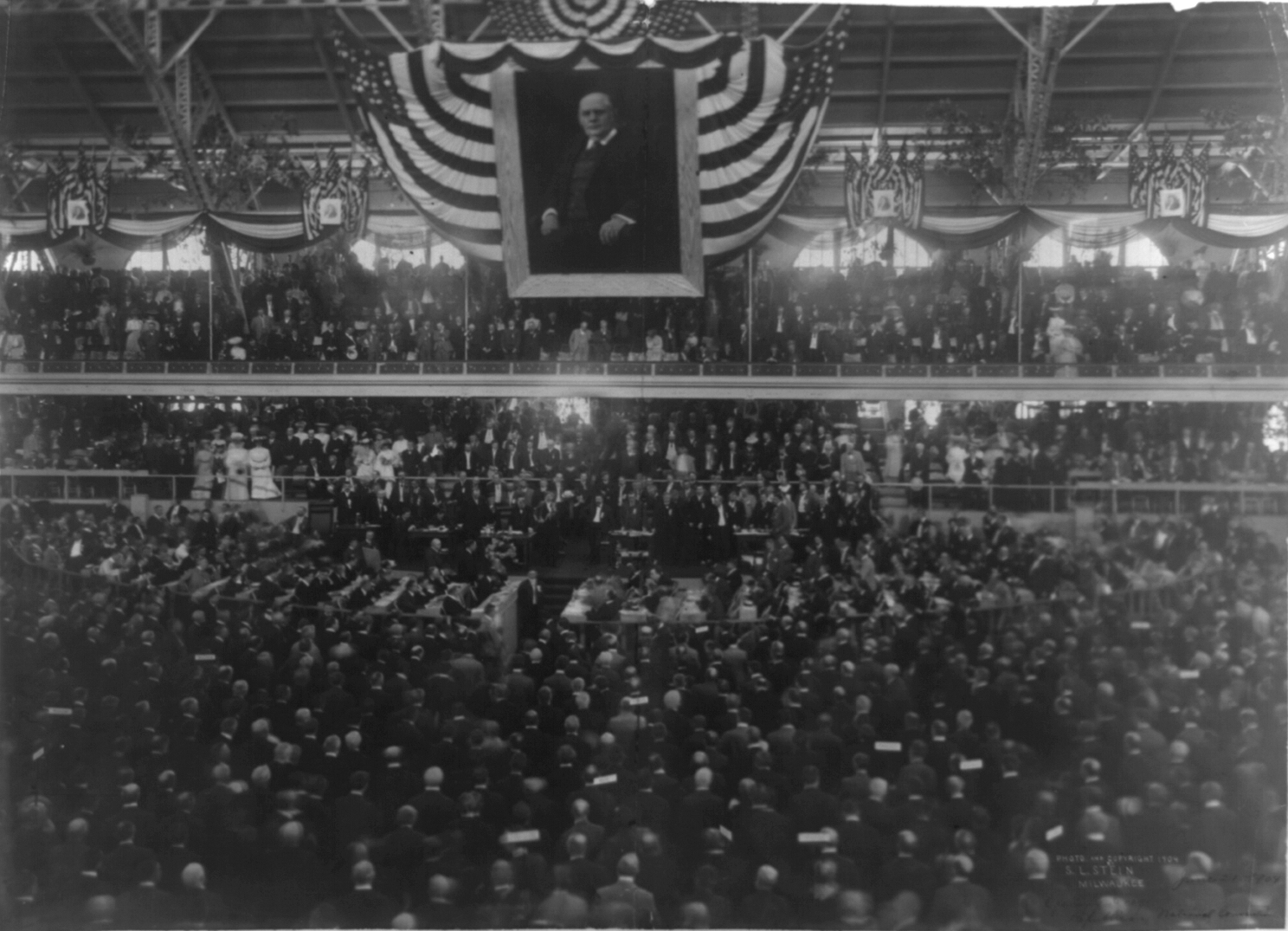
Convention hall during the opening prayer

Delegates from Wisconsin controlled by Robert M. La Follette were not seated and conservative delegates controlled by John Coit Spooner were accepted instead.

Two delegations, one all-white lily-white delegation led by Henry C. Warmoth and a mixed-race black-and-tan delegation led by Walter L. Cohen, were sent from Louisiana. The credentials committee voted to seat the black-and-tan delegation on June 16, but later changed it to accept four at-large delegates from both factions and each one holding half a vote.

Alternate delegate Abraham Ruef of California in Leslie's Weekly

Elihu Root and Joseph Gurney Cannon were selected as the presiding officers of the convention. Henry Cabot Lodge was selected to chair the Committee on Resolutions. As temporary chair of the convention, Root delivered its keynote address.

== Platform ==
The 1904 Republican platform favored the protective tariff, increased foreign trade, the gold standard, expansion of the Merchant Marine and strengthening of the United States Navy; it also praised Roosevelt's foreign and domestic policies.

== Vice presidential candidates ==
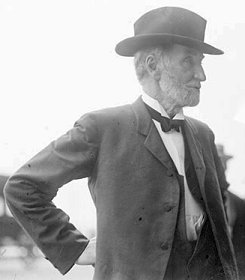
Speaker of the House Joseph Gurney Cannon at the convention

As Theodore Roosevelt had ascended to the presidency following the death of William McKinley on September 14, 1901, he served the remainder of McKinley's term without a vice president as the Twenty-fifth Amendment to the United States Constitution had not yet been passed. This also left the convention with the task of choosing a running mate for Roosevelt.

Entering the convention, Senator Charles Fairbanks of Indiana was considered the likely favorite for the vice presidential nomination, but the Roosevelt administration favored Illinois Representative Robert R. Hitt or Secretary of War William Howard Taft of Ohio; Speaker Joseph Gurney Cannon of Illinois also had support among the delegates, but Cannon had no desire to leave his position in the House. After the administration decided not to launch a fight over the nomination of Fairbanks, he was nominated by acclamation.

== Speakers ==
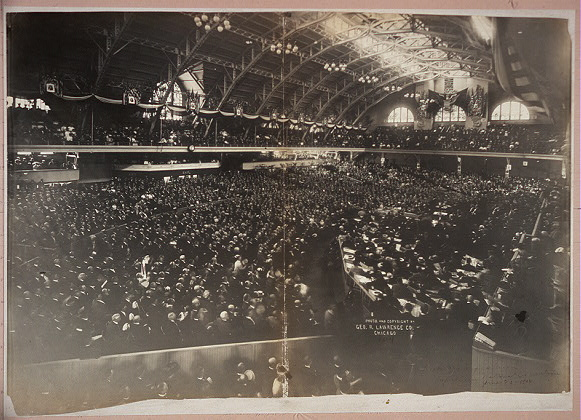
Crowds hear Elihu Root deliver the convention's opening speech.

There were significantly fewer speakers at the 1904 convention than there are at a typical convention today. This is because the convention at the time was much lower in viewership (as there were not the mass media devices of TV or radio at this time only those actually invited saw it). Also, this was before the primary era so the delegates were expected to nominate the candidate at the actual convention as well as more typical tasks such as electing the chairman and handling other business which varies in importance at the Republican Convention today. Nonetheless, there were speeches by the following individuals at the 1904 Republican National Convention:

=== Tuesday, June 21 ===
- Opening prayer by Rev. Timothy Prescott Frost, D. D.
- Elihu Root, United States Secretary of War

=== Wednesday, June 22 ===
- Opening prayer by Rev. Thomas E. Cox
- Joseph Gurney Cannon, Speaker of the United States House of Representatives and Convention Chairman.

=== Thursday, June 23 ===
- Opening prayer by Rev. Thaddeus A. Snively
- Frank S. Black, Governor of New York
- Albert J. Beveridge, United States Senator from Indiana
- George A. Knight, attorney and businessman
- H.S. Edwards, Southern writer
- William O'Connell Bradley, former Kentucky Governor
- Joseph B. Cotton, former Minnesota State Representative
- Harry Sythe Cummings, first African-American City Councilman from Baltimore, Maryland
- Jonathan P. Dolliver, United States Senator from Iowa
- Chauncey Depew, United States Senator from New York
- Joseph B. Foraker, United States Senator from Ohio and former Governor of Ohio
- Samuel W. Pennypacker, Governor of Pennsylvania
- Thomas H. Carter, United States Senator from Montana

Roosevelt and his running mate Charles W. Fairbanks were unanimously nominated, but unlike candidates today, they did not give convention speeches, instead having individuals give nominating speeches for them. Roosevelt's nomination speech was made by former New York Governor Frank S. Black and was seconded by Indiana Senator Albert Beveridge. Fairbanks's nomination speech was made by Iowa Senator Jonathan P. Dolliver and was seconded by New York Senator Chauncey Depew.

== See also ==
- History of the United States Republican Party
- List of Republican National Conventions
- United States presidential nominating convention
- 1904 United States presidential election
- 1904 Democratic National Convention

== Works cited ==
- Mowry, George (1960). Theodore Roosevelt and the Progressive Movement. University of Wisconsin Press.
- Sherman, Richard (1973). The Republican Party and Black America From McKinley to Hoover 1896-1933. University of Virginia Press. ISBN 0813904676.

=== Bibliography ===
- Official Proceedings of the Thirteenth Republican National Convention: Held in the City of Chicago, June 21, 22, 23, 1904

Preceded by 1900; Philadelphia, Pennsylvania	Republican National Conventions	Succeeded by 1908; Chicago, Illinois
