= New York State Insurance Department =

Regulatory agency in New York State, US

The New York State Insurance Department (NYSID) was the state agency responsible for supervising and regulating all insurance business in New York State. It was regarded in the industry as one of the most state-of-the-art insurance regulatory agencies.

Continuing education for insurance professionals is regulated by each state's Department for Insurance, although there are commonalties across the states. See Insurance Continuing Education.

Effective October 3, 2011, Governor Andrew Cuomo and the New York State Legislature consolidated the New York State Insurance Department and the New York State Banking Department and created the New York State Department of Financial Services.

== History ==
Until 1849, insurance companies doing business in New York State were chartered by special acts of the New York State Legislature. In 1849, the Legislature passed a law requiring prospective insurance companies to file incorporation papers with the New York Secretary of State. The law also vested regulatory power over insurance companies with the State Comptroller, who was authorized to require the companies to submit annual financial statements and to deny a company the right to operate if capital securities and investments did not remain secure.

In 1859, the New York State Legislature created the New York State Insurance Department, and assumed the functions of the Comptroller and Secretary of State relating to insurance. The department began operations in 1860 and William F. Barnes was the first Superintendent of Insurance. The Home Life Insurance Company based in Brooklyn, New York was the first life insurer to be authorized by the newly formed New York State Insurance Department in 1860. Superintendent Barnes supervised the filings of 155 fire insurance companies and 16 life insurance companies during his first year in office.

By the 1870s, each state regulated insurance in some manner and most had an insurance department or agency. However, because different state requirements led to confusion in the insurance industry, New York State Superintendent George W. Miller, in 1871, invited the heads of insurance departments or agencies from other states to meet in New York to strive for more uniform regulation. Eighteen states met that year for the first session of what is now the National Association of Insurance Commissioners ("NAIC").

Mismanagement in the life insurance business, including exorbitant salaries and questionable investments, resulted in a 1905 investigation led by Charles Evans Hughes. The investigation, known as the "Armstrong Investigation", led to the passage of a law that set forth a series of reforms, including mandatory periodic examinations of all life insurers.

During the Great Depression, the Insurance Department promoted new rules clarifying insurer investment requirements, setting more equitable determination of cash surrender values and forfeitures, and recognizing up-to-date values and improvements in mortality tables. They also carried out liquidations, such as the 1934 liquidation of the Consolidated Indemnity and Insurance Company.

After World War II, the Insurance Department pioneered many consumer protections, including comprehensive mandated health insurance benefits, open enrollment, and prohibitions against insurers arbitrarily dropping an individual's health insurance coverage.

The New York State Insurance Department was the first insurance department or agency in the United States to establish a capital markets group to examine and measure the risks in insurer investment practices, and was the first state to recognize the importance of segregating multiple lines insurance from financial guaranty insurance as a means of preventing systemic risk.

In 2001, New York was the first state to establish an Insurance Emergency Operations Center ("IEOC"), which was designed to accelerate disaster assessments and expedite claims payments to disaster victims. The IEOC helped New Yorkers recover from the September 11, 2001 terrorist attacks.

During the 2008 financial crisis, the Insurance Department helped stabilize financial guaranty insurers and worked with federal regulators to ensure that AIG did not collapse when it experienced a liquidity crisis.

In 2011, Governor Andrew M. Cuomo and the New York State Legislature consolidated the New York State Insurance Department and the New York State Banking Department and created the New York State Department of Financial Services. James J. Wrynn was the fortieth and last Superintendent of Insurance. Following the creation of the New York Department of Financial Services Benjamin Lawsky (2011–2015) and Maria Vullo (2016--) were each appointed and confirmed as Superintendent of Financial Services thereby assuming the powers and duties formerly held by the Superintendent of Insurance.

== List of superintendents ==
| Superintendent | Took office | Left office | Party | Notes |
|---|---|---|---|---|
| William Barnes Sr. | January 12, 1860 | February 5, 1870 | Republican | two terms |
| George W. Miller | February 4, 1870 | May 12, 1872 | | |
| George B. Church | May 13, 1872 | November 28, 1872 | | |
| Orlow W. Chapman | November 29, 1872 | January 31, 1876 | | |
| William Smyth | February 1, 1876 | February 20, 1877 | | |
| John F. Smyth | February 21, 1877 | April 26, 1880 | | |
| Charles G. Fairman | April 27, 1880 | April 22, 1883 | | |
| John A. McCall | April 23, 1883 | December 31, 1885 | | |
| Robert A. Maxwell | January 1, 1886 | February 11, 1891 | Democrat | |
| James F. Pierce | February 12, 1891 | February 10, 1897 | Democrat | two terms |
| Louis F. Payn | February 11, 1897 | February 1, 1900 | Republican | one term |
| Francis Hendricks | February 2, 1900 | May 16, 1906 | Republican | two terms |
| Otto Kelsey | May 17, 1906 | January 13, 1909 | Republican | |
| Henry D. Appleton | January 14, 1909 | February 17, 1909 | | |
| William H. Hotchkiss | February 18, 1909 | February 18, 1912 | | |
| William T. Emmet | February 21, 1912 | April 1, 1914 | | |
| Frank Hasbrouck | April 2, 1914 | June 30, 1915 | | |
| Jesse S. Phillips | July 1, 1915 | October 31, 1921 | | |
| Henry D. Appleton | November 1, 1921 | November 30, 1921 | | |
| Francis R. Stoddard Jr. | December 1, 1921 | June 30, 1924 | | |
| James A. Beha | July 1, 1924 | December 31, 1928 | | |
| Albert Conway | January 1, 1929 | July 30, 1930 | | |
| Thomas F. Behan | July 1, 1930 | February 16, 1931 | | |
| Henry A. Thellusson | February 17, 1931 | March 4, 1931 | | |
| George S. Van Schaick | March 5, 1931 | March 10, 1935 | | |
| Louis H. Pink | May 10, 1935 | January 31, 1943 | | |
| Robert E. Dineen | September 23, 1943 | June 30, 1950 | | |
| Alfred J. Bohlinger | July 1, 1950 | January 31, 1955 | | |
| Leffert Holz | February 3, 1955 | March 15, 1958 | | |
| Julius S. Wikler | March 17, 1958 | January 26, 1959 | | |
| Thomas Thacher | January 27, 1959 | October 2, 1963 | | |
| Samuel C. Cantor | October 3, 1963 | January 27, 1964 | | |
| Henry Root Stern | January 28, 1964 | December 31, 1966 | | |
| Richard E. Stewart | January 1, 1967 | December 31, 1970 | | |
| Benjamin R. Schenck | January 1, 1971 | March 10, 1975 | | |
| Lawrence W. Keepnews | March 18, 1975 | April 21, 1975 | | |
| John P. Gemma | May 8, 1975 | June 23, 1975 | | |
| Thomas A. Harnett | June 24, 1975 | July 20, 1977 | | |
| John F. Lennon | July 21, 1977 | January 4, 1978 | | |
| Albert B. Lewis | January 5, 1978 | March 7, 1983 | | |
| James P. Corcoran | March 9, 1983 | January 26, 1990 | | |
| Wendy Cooper | January 27, 1990 | July 1, 1990 | | |
| Salvatore R. Curiale | July 1, 1990 | December 31, 1994 | | |
| Edward J. Muhl | February 14, 1995 | December 29, 1996 | Republican | |
| Neil D. Levin | April 1, 1997 | April 5, 2001 | Republican | |
| Gregory V. Serio | May 9, 2001 | January 17, 2005 | Republican | |
| Howard Mills III | May 18, 2005 | December 31, 2006 | Republican | |
| Louis W. Pietroluongo | January 1, 2007 | January 28, 2007 | | |
| Eric R. Dinallo | January 29, 2007 | July 3, 2009 | Democrat | |
| Kermitt J. Brooks | July 4, 2009 | August 18, 2009 | Democrat | |
| James J. Wrynn | 2009 | 2011 | Democrat | |
