= John D. Teller =

American judge

John DuBois Teller

Personal details
- Born: May 11, 1845 Sandy Hill, New York
- Died: January 19, 1922 (aged 76) Auburn, New York
- Education: Williams College
- Occupation: Lawyer, Judge
- Known for: Police Justice of Auburn, County Surrogate

John DuBois Teller (May 11, 1845 – January 19, 1922) was an American lawyer and judge from New York.

== Life ==
Teller was born on May 11, 1845, on a farm near Sandy Hill, New York, the son of Benjamin F. Teller and Elizabeth DuBois. He moved with his family to Sandy Hill when he was 7.

After attending the William McLaren classical school, Teller entered Williams College when he was 18. He graduated from there in 1867, giving an oration on commencement day. His classmates included G. Stanley Hall, Hamilton Wright Mabie, Francis Lynde Stetson, and President of Hawaii Sanford B. Dole. After graduating, he spent the next three years studying law in the office of Hughes & Northrup at Sandy Hill. During this time, he was elected village clerk and justice of the peace. After he was admitted to the bar in 1870, he initially practiced law in Sandy Hill and, in 1871, unsuccessfully ran for district attorney of Washington County. In 1872, he moved to Auburn and practiced law there. He practiced law with David Wright until 1875, when he practiced alone for several years. In 1890, he formed a partnership with William H. Hotchkiss, who studied law in his office and served as his clerk in court. After Hotchkiss moved to Buffalo a year later, Teller created a partnership with Thomas M. Hunt, who also studied law in his office. He was a director of the Cayuga County National Bank and a trustee of the Auburn City Hospital, the Central Presbyterian Church, and the Auburn Theological Seminary.

A Democrat, Teller was elected police justice of Auburn in 1877 and served in that office until 1880. In 1883, he was elected county surrogate. He was re-elected to that office and served for a total of six years. He unsuccessfully ran for the New York Supreme Court in 1887, the New York Court of Appeals in 1895, and the New York State Senate in 1897.

Teller was a Presbyterian. He was president of the Central New York Golf League and a member of Delta Kappa Epsilon. He never married.

Teller died at home from neuritis on January 19, 1922. He was buried in Rhinebeck.
