= James F. Pierce =

American politician

James Farnsworth Pierce
- Born: April 8, 1830; Madrid, New York
- Died: July 8, 1905 (aged 75); Brooklyn, New York
- Resting place: Green-Wood Cemetery

James Farnsworth Pierce (April 8, 1830 in Madrid, St. Lawrence County, New York – July 8, 1905 in Brooklyn, New York City) was an American lawyer and politician from New York.

== Life ==
He was the son of Caleb Pierce, M.D. (1799–1887) and Sarah Emily (Farnsworth) Pierce (1807–1865). He studied law, first in Potsdam, then with Job Pierson in Troy; was admitted to the bar in Albany in 1851; and, going south to recover from lung disease, commenced practice in St. Augustine, Florida in partnership with Isaac H. Bronson. In 1856, he returned to New York, and resumed the practice of law at Canton. He married Anna Maria Redington (1835–1904), and they had six children. He was Clerk of St. Lawrence County from 1862 to 1864.

In 1865, he moved to New York City, and the next year to Brooklyn. He was a Democratic member of the New York State Senate (2nd D.) from 1868 to 1871, sitting in the 91st, 92nd, 93rd and 94th New York State Legislatures.

Pierce was again a member of the State Senate in 1878 and 1879; and again from 1886 to 1889, sitting in the 109th, 110th, 111th and 112th New York State Legislatures.

He was Superintendent of Insurance from 1891 to 1897.

Pierce died of "paralysis" at his home at 7 Montague Terrace, in Brooklyn, and was buried at the Green-Wood Cemetery in Brooklyn.

== Family ==
James F. Pierce was a fourth cousin twice removed of President Franklin Pierce, their common ancestor being Thomas Pierce (1618–1683).

== Sources ==
- The New York Civil List compiled by Franklin Benjamin Hough, Stephen C. Hutchins and Edgar Albert Werner (1870; pg. 444 and 547)
- Life Sketches of the State Officers, Senators, and Members of the Assembly of the State of New York in 1868 by S. R. Harlow & S. C. Hutchins (pg. 136ff)
- Pierce genealogy at RootsWeb
- UNFIT FOR PUBLIC OFFICE; JAMES F. PIERCE CANDIDATE FOR A POSITION OF TRUST in NYT on February 8, 1891
- HILL'S MAN TAKES HOLD; PIERCE IN THE OFFICE of SUPERINTENDENT OF INSURANCE in NYT on February 20, 1891
- A FAITHFUL OFFICER REWARDED; Superintendent of Insurance Pierce Confirmed for a Second Term in NYT on February 28, 1894

New York State Senate
Preceded by Henry R. Pierson	New York State Senate; 2nd District; 1868–1871	Succeeded by John C. Perry
Preceded by John R. Kennaday	New York State Senate; 2nd District; 1878–1879	Succeeded by William H. Murtha
Preceded by John J. Kiernan	New York State Senate; 2nd District; 1886–1889	Succeeded by John C. Jacobs
Government offices
Preceded by Robert A. Maxwell	Superintendent of Insurance; 1891–1897	Succeeded by Louis F. Payn
