= Consolidated Indemnity and Insurance Company =

- Founded: October+ 1928
- Headquarters: Hartford, Connecticut
- Area served: Virginia; Kentucky; Maryland; Tennessee; West Virginia; District of Columbia
- Key people: Saul Singer; C. Stanley Mitchell; John F. Gilchrist

Consolidated Indemnity and Insurance Company was a Hartford, Connecticut-based firm which became insolvent during the Great Depression. The corporation is important because it employed executives who were formerly directors of significant business concerns of New York City, in the early 1930s and before. Consolidated Indemnity and Insurance Company was organized in October 1928 with a capital of $2,500,000 and a surplus of $7,300,000. Among its fifteen directors were Saul Singer, vice-president of the New York Bank of the United States and C. Stanley Mitchell, president of the Central Mercantile Trust Company. Its president was John F. Gilchrist, chairman of the Tate Transit Commission. Gilchrist was a close personal and boyhood friend of Alfred E. Smith.

The insurance firm opened division offices in Virginia, Kentucky, Maryland, Tennessee, West Virginia, and the District of Columbia in August 1929.

In July 1931 a suit was initiated by New York State against Consolidated Indemnity to recover $600,000 on a bond guaranteeing the state deposits in the insolvent New York Bank of the United States. Following a decision of the Appellate Division of the Third Department, the trial proceeded to the New York State Supreme Court in Albany, New York.

The business merged with the Transportation Indemnity Co. of New York in May 1932. Capital of the combined corporations was $800,000.

Liquidation of Consolidated Indemnity was carried out by the New York State Insurance Department in 1934. The business tried unsuccessfully to obtain a loan from the Reconstruction Finance Corporation. At the time of its failure the company possessed a total of $33,231 free cash and a debt amounting to $400,000.
