= 1900 Republican National Convention =

American political convention

- 1900 presidential election
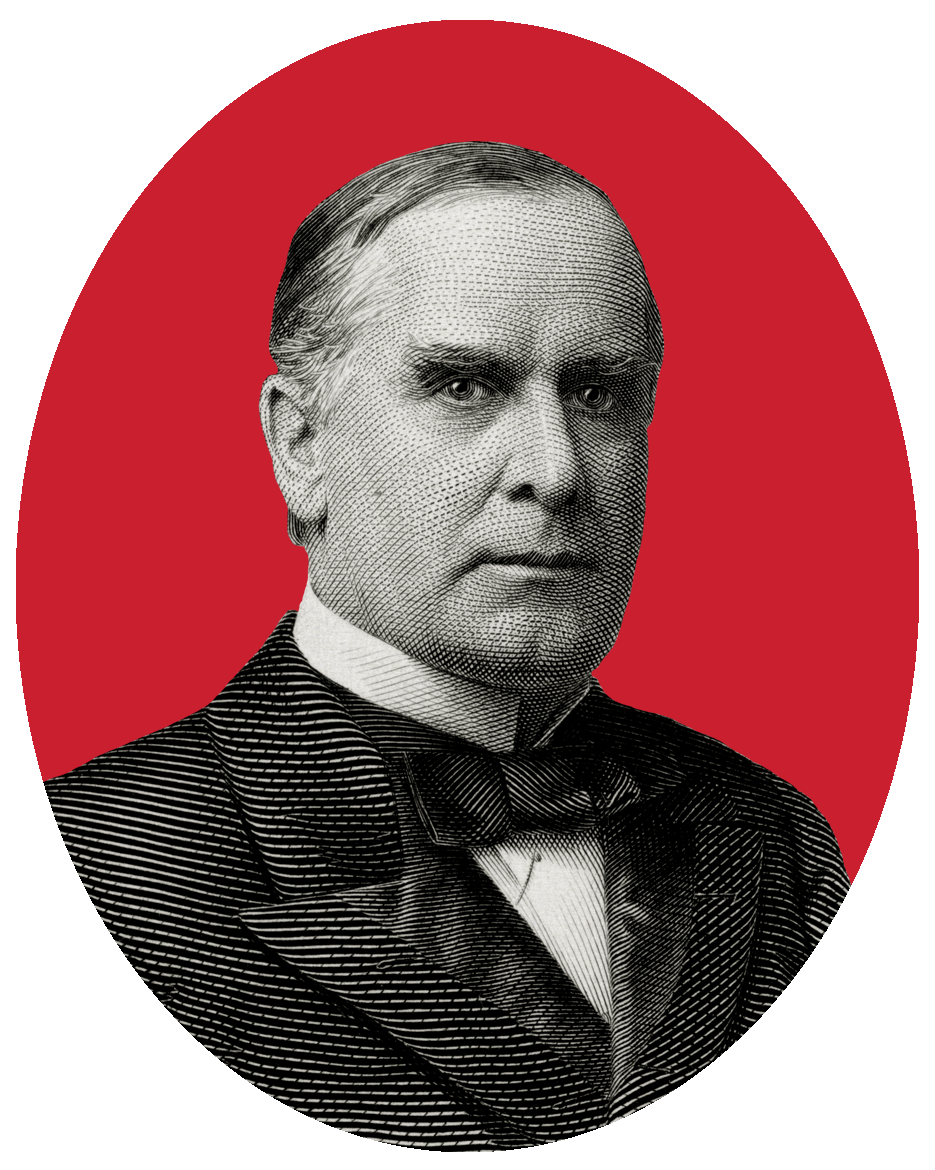
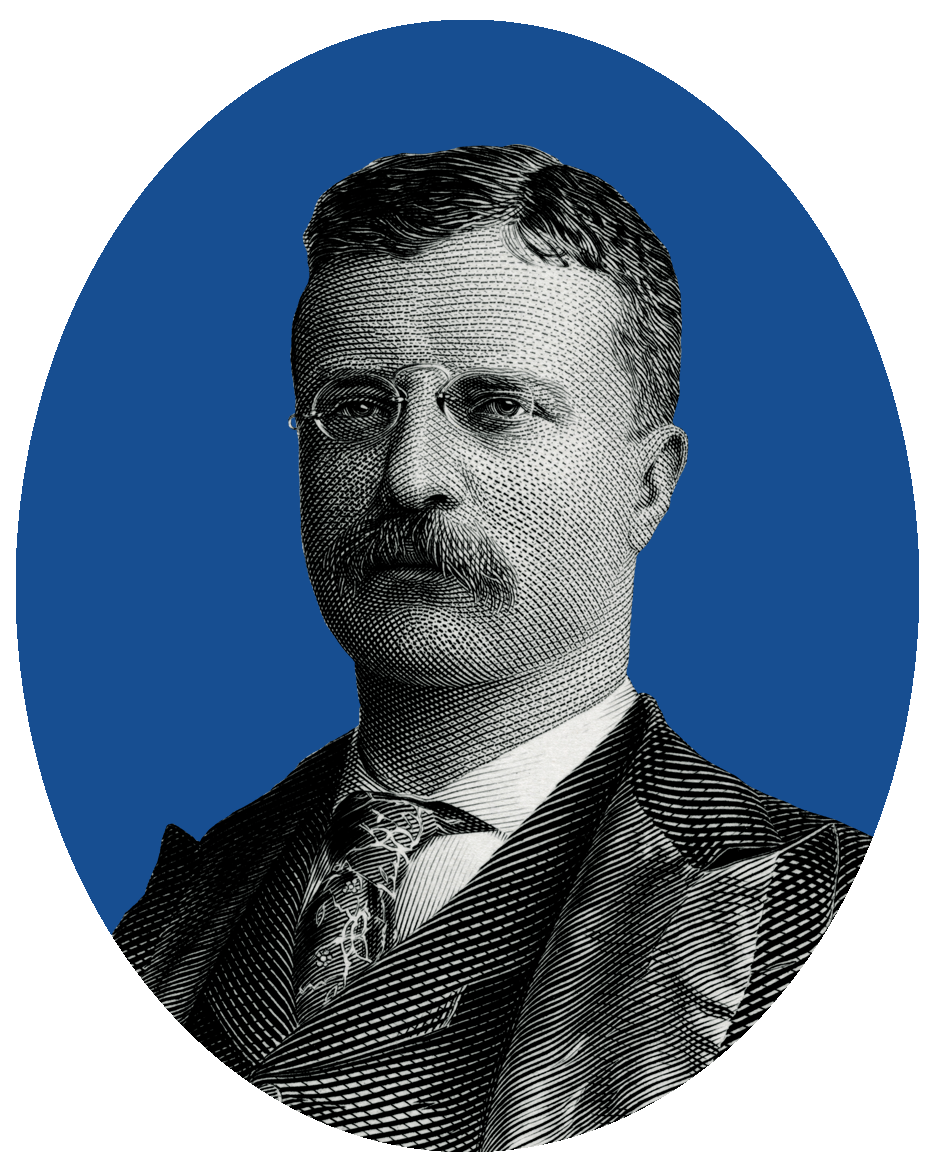
- Nominees; McKinley and Roosevelt

Convention
- Date(s): June 19–21, 1900
- City: Philadelphia, Pennsylvania
- Venue: Convention Hall
- Chair: Henry Cabot Lodge

Candidates
- Presidential nominee: William McKinley of Ohio
- Vice-presidential nominee: Theodore Roosevelt of New York

Voting
- Total delegates: 926
- Votes needed for nomination: 464
- Results (president): McKinley (OH): 926 (100%)
- Results (vice president): Roosevelt (NY): 925 (99.9%); Abstaining: 1 (0.1%)
- Ballots: 1

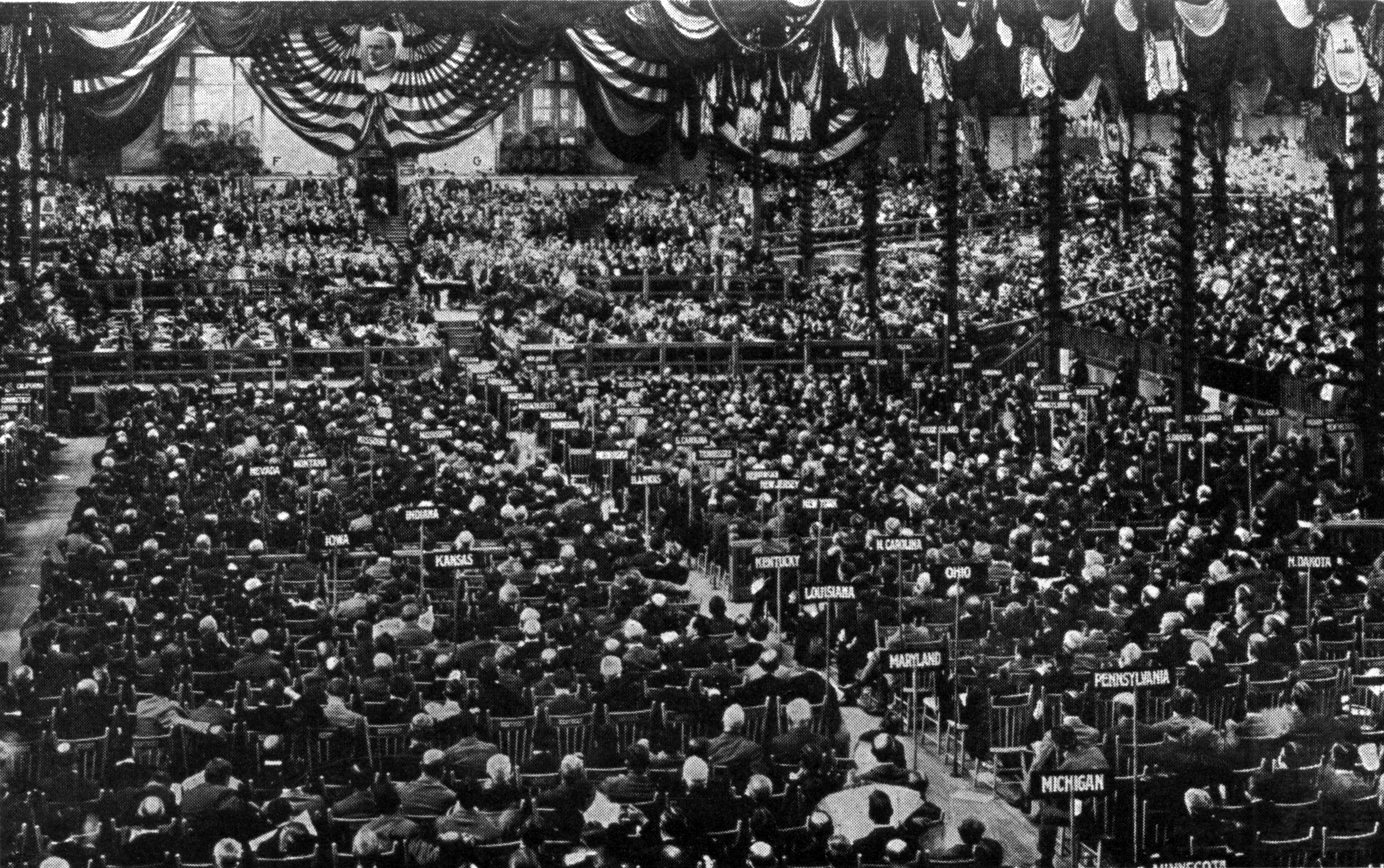
Photograph of the convention

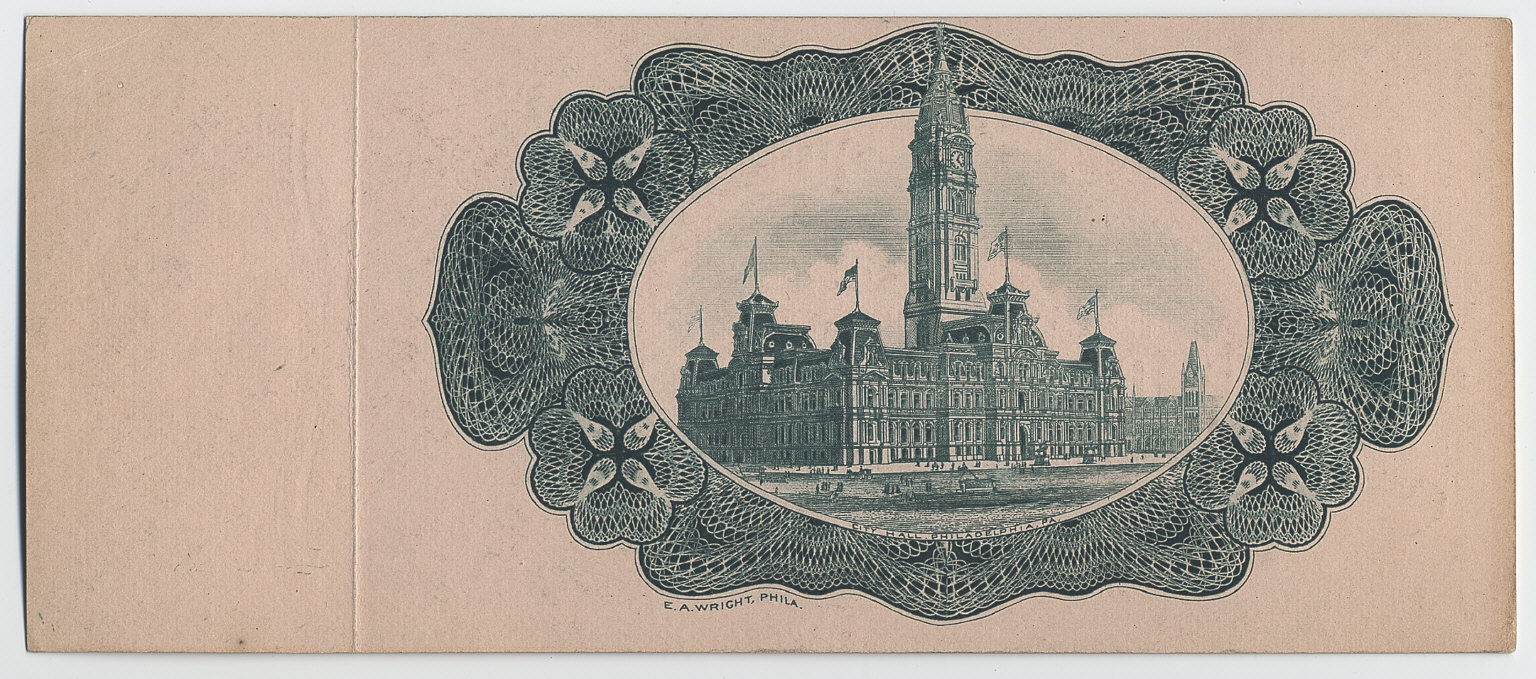
Admission ticket featuring an illustration of Philadelphia City Hall

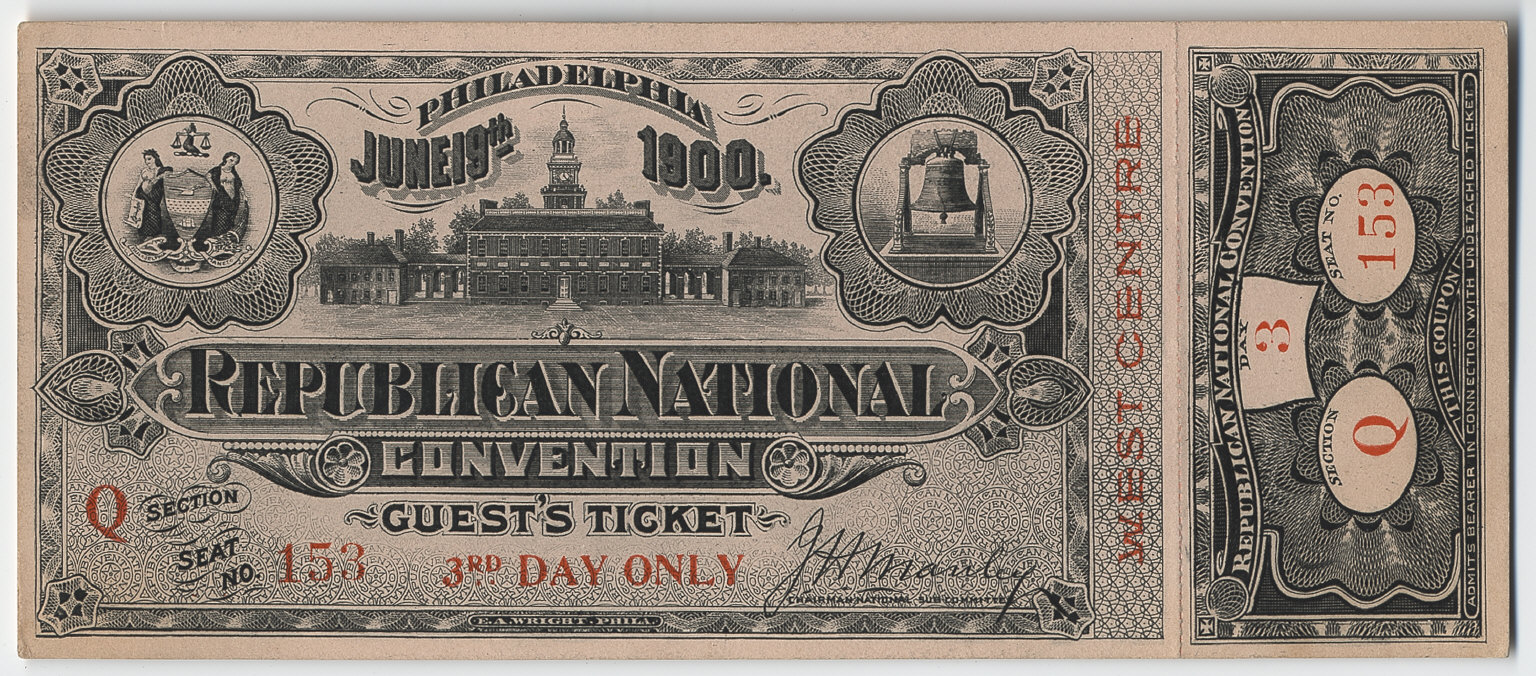
Admission ticket featuring illustrations of Independence Hall and the Liberty Bell (both being Philadelphia landmarks)

The 1900 Republican National Convention was held June 19 to June 21 in the Exposition Auditorium, Philadelphia, Pennsylvania. The Exposition Auditorium was located south of the University of Pennsylvania, and the later Convention Hall was constructed along the building's east wall. It was demolished in 2006.

Each state was allotted two delegates per electoral vote, and territories were granted from two to six delegates. Altogether, there were 926 delegates and an equal number of alternates.

Mark Hanna opened the convention, and proposed that Senator Edward O. Wolcott of Colorado serve as temporary chairman: this was to show that the party had overcome its division in 1896, when the Colorado delegation walked out of the Republican Convention after a dispute over federal subsidies for the silver industry. Senator Henry Cabot Lodge of Massachusetts served as the convention's permanent chairman.

President William McKinley was unanimously nominated for reelection after no candidate ran against him, although Admiral George Dewey considered a run.

Governor Theodore Roosevelt of New York, who was a delegate, was nominated for vice president by a vote of 925 to zero; he abstained from the vote.

== State delegates ==
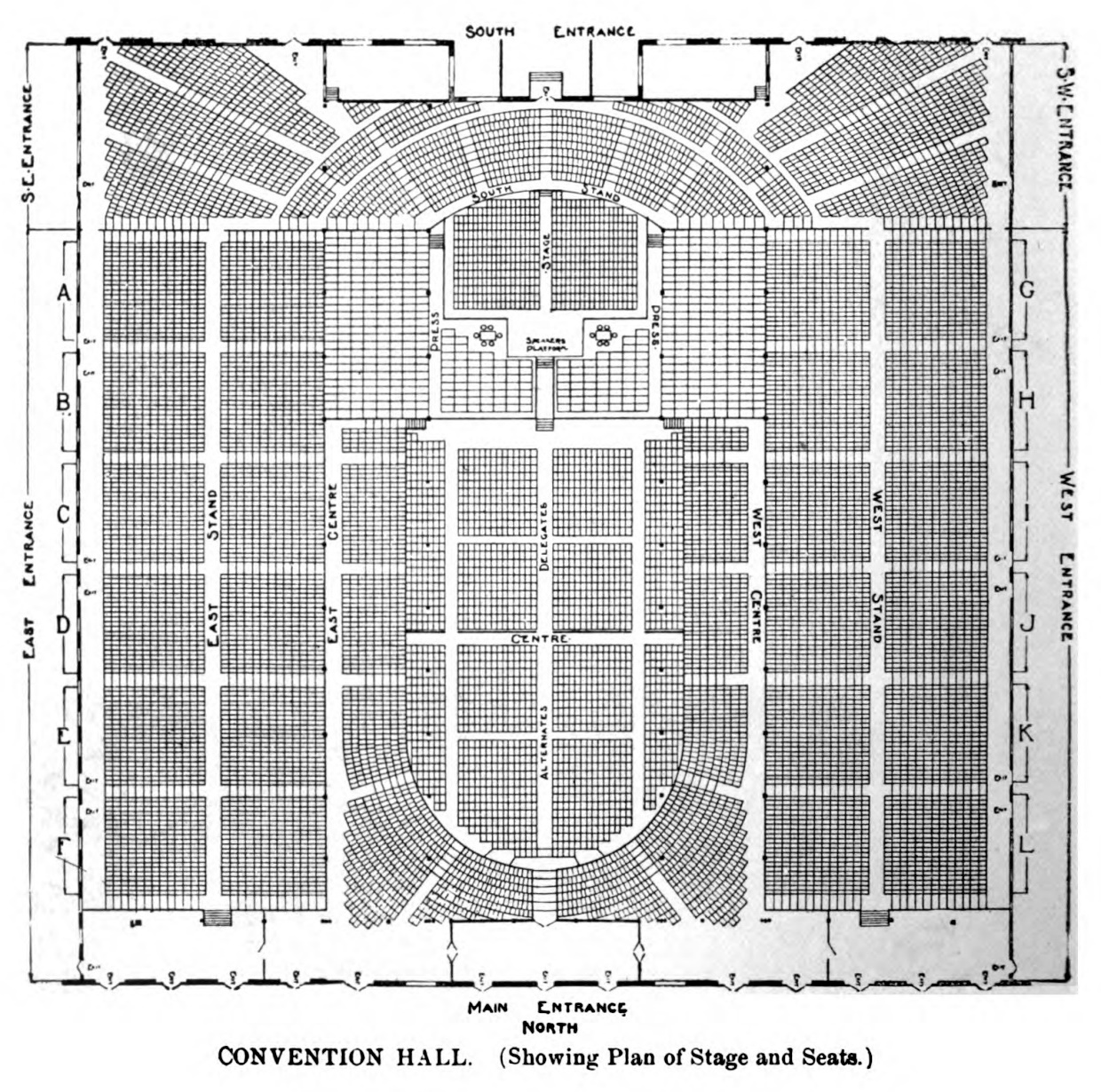
Layout of convention hall during convention

The 1900 Republican National Convention included a historic first for the Republican Party: Frances Warren of Wyoming served as the party's first-ever female convention delegate. Additionally Jennie L. McCargar Jones, of Utah, and Susan Henderson West of Idaho served as alternate delegates.

== Speakers ==
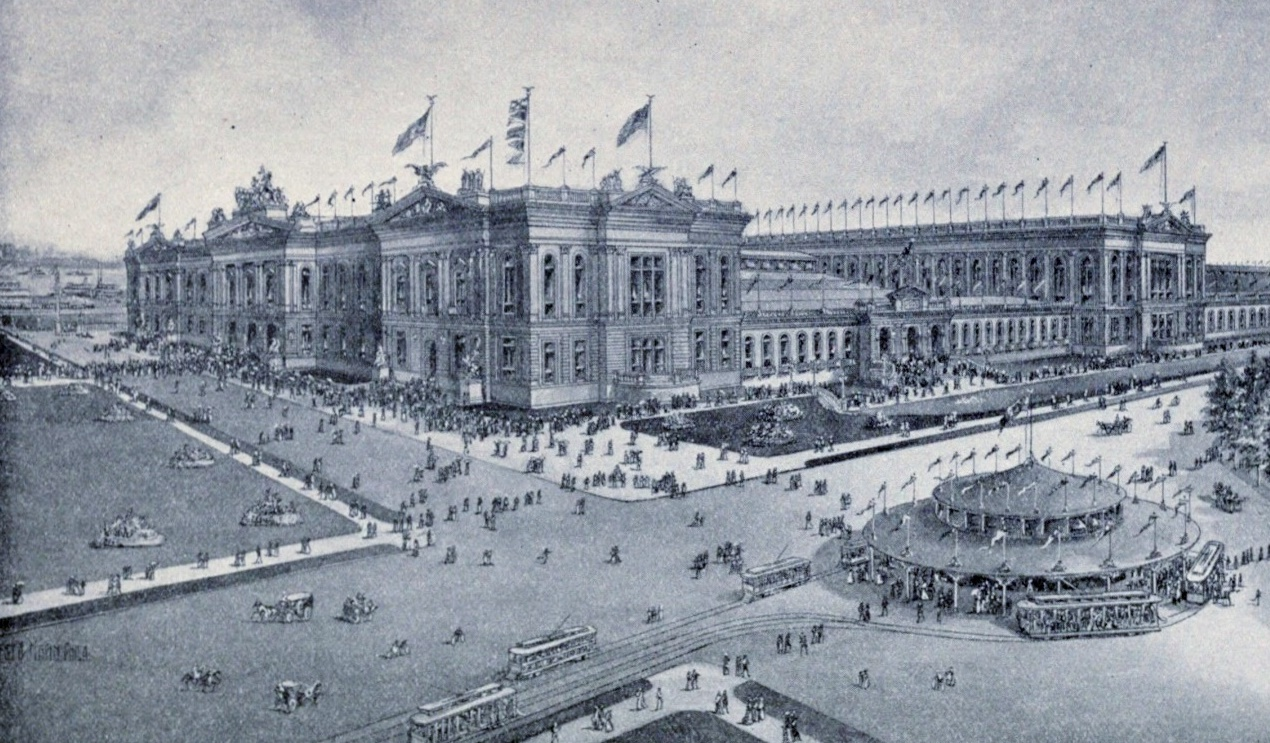
Illustration depicting the exterior of the venue during the convention

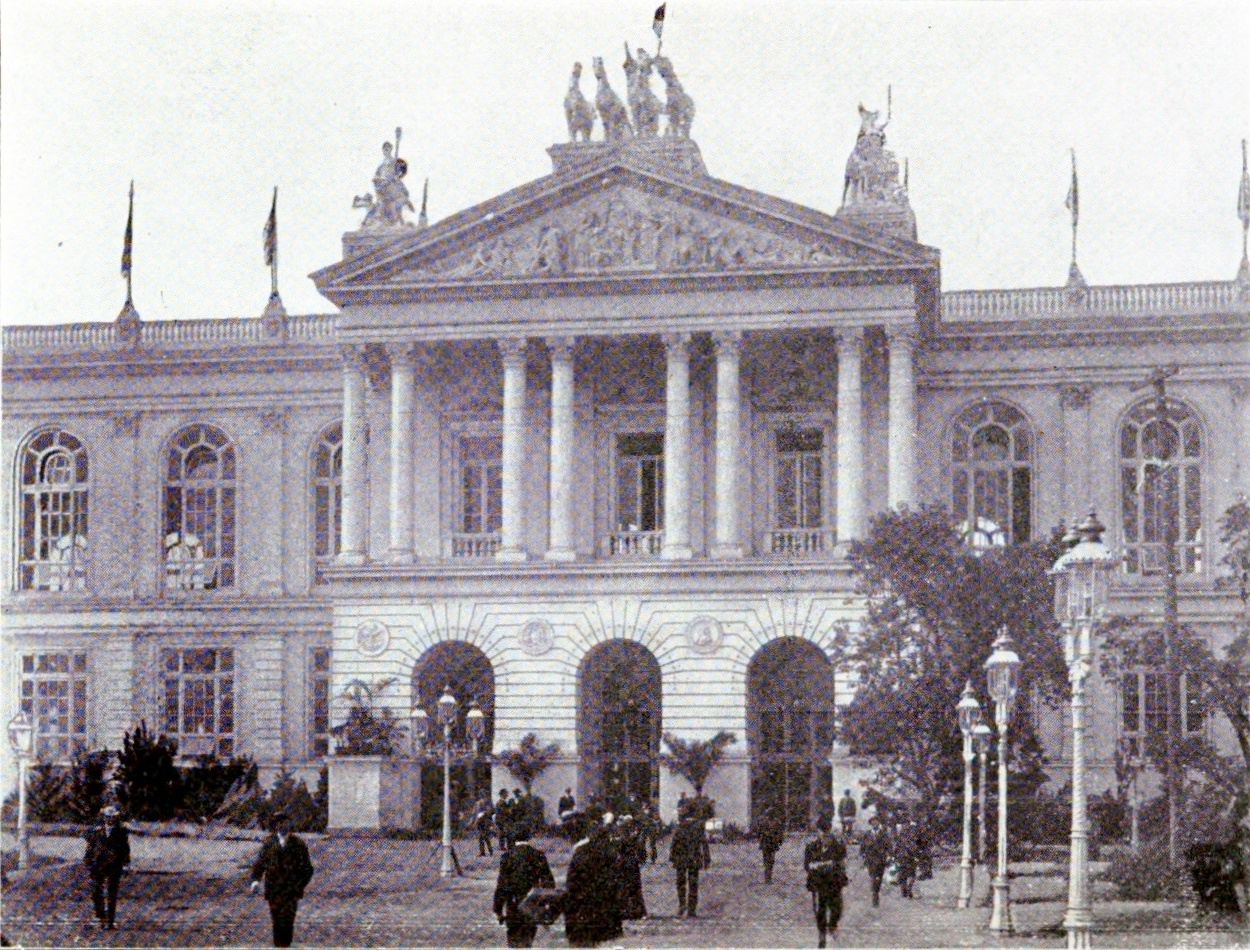
Photograph of an entrance to the venue during the convention

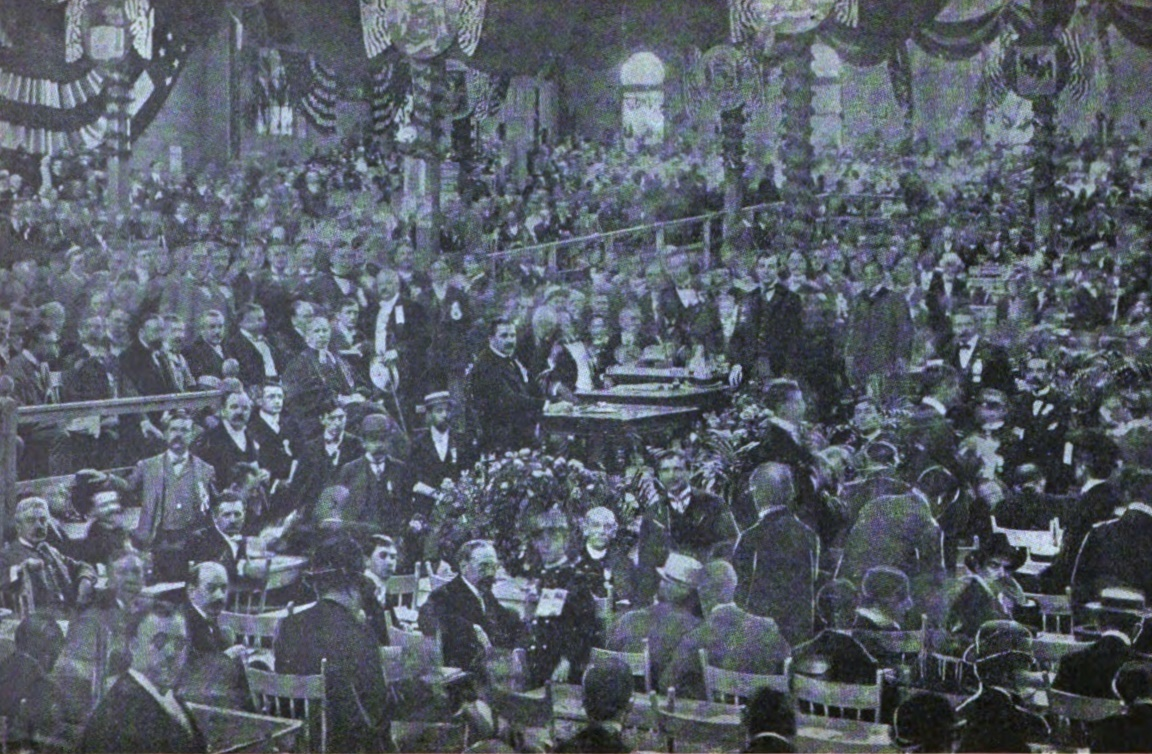
Photograph of the convention floor

The convention's speakers included:

=== June 19 ===
- Prayer by Rev. James Gray Bolton D.D.
- Senator Mark Hanna (Ohio)
- Senator Edward O. Wolcott (Colorado)

=== June 20 ===
- Prayer by Rev. Charles M. Boswell D.D.
- Senator Henry Cabot Lodge (Massachusetts)

=== June 21 ===
- Prayer by Most Rev. P. J. Ryan, Archbishop of Philadelphia
- Senator Joseph B. Foraker (Ohio), McKinley nominating speech
- Theodore Roosevelt, Governor of New York, McKinley seconding speech

Balloting: President McKinley was nominated unanimously. This was the first unanimous nomination since President Grant in 1872.

- John W. Yerkes, IRS Commissioner from Kentucky
- George A. Knight, attorney and businessman from California
- James A. Mount, Governor of Indiana

Boss Platt of New York wanted to be rid of reformist governor Roosevelt. He persuaded Roosevelt to accept nomination for the vacant office of Vice President.

- Lafayette Young, newspaper reporter from Iowa, Roosevelt nominating speech
- M. J. Murray, local politician from Massachusetts, Roosevelt seconding speech
- General James M. Ashton, lawyer and soldier from Washington, Roosevelt seconding speech

Balloting: Roosevelt was nominated for vice president, though he abstained from voting on his own nomination.

- Senator Chauncey Depew (New York)

== Vice-presidential nomination ==
=== Vice-presidential candidates ===
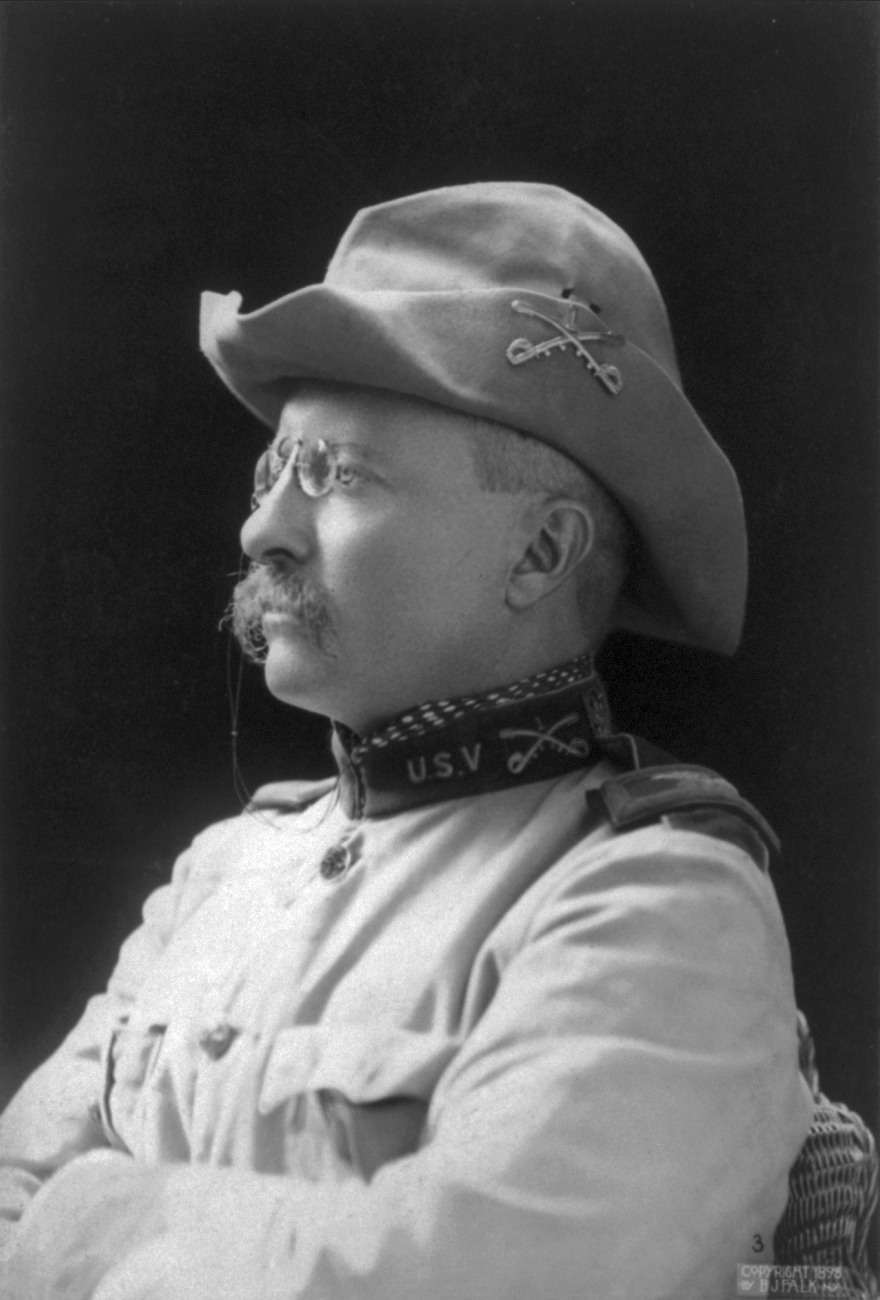
Governor
Theodore Roosevelt
of New York

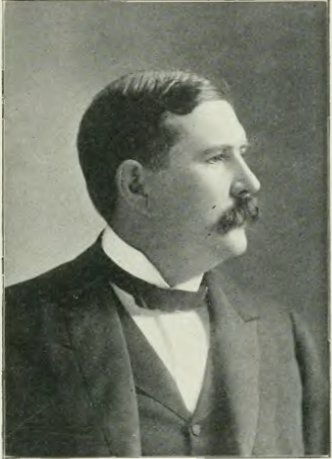
Representative Jonathan P. Dolliver
of Iowa
(withdrawn)

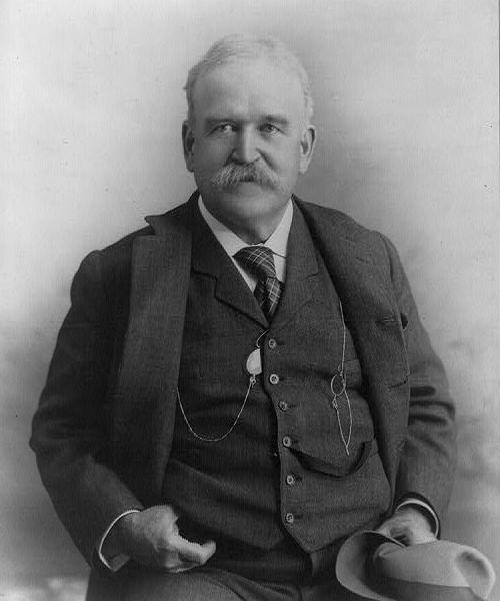
Navy Secretary
John D. Long
of Massachusetts
(withdrawn)

=== Candidates considered ===
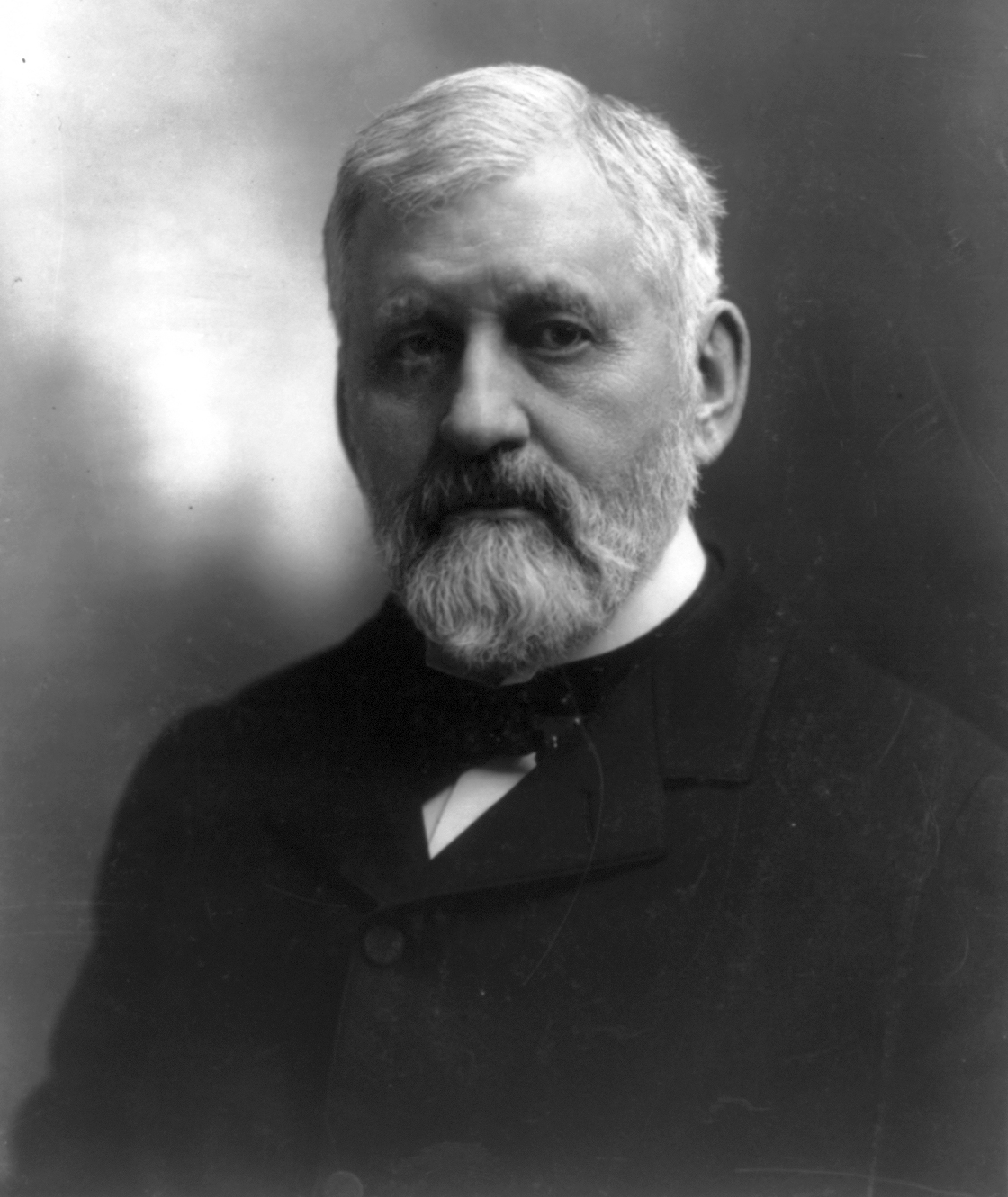
Senator
William B. Allison
of Iowa

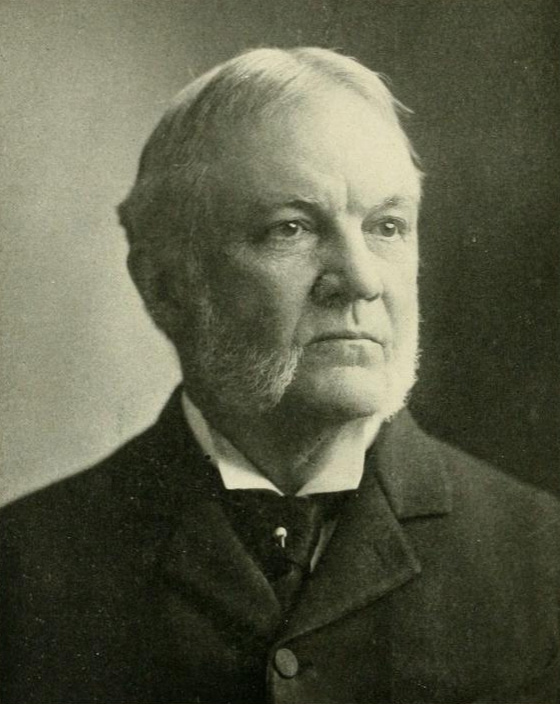
Former Interior Secretary
Cornelius Bliss
of New York

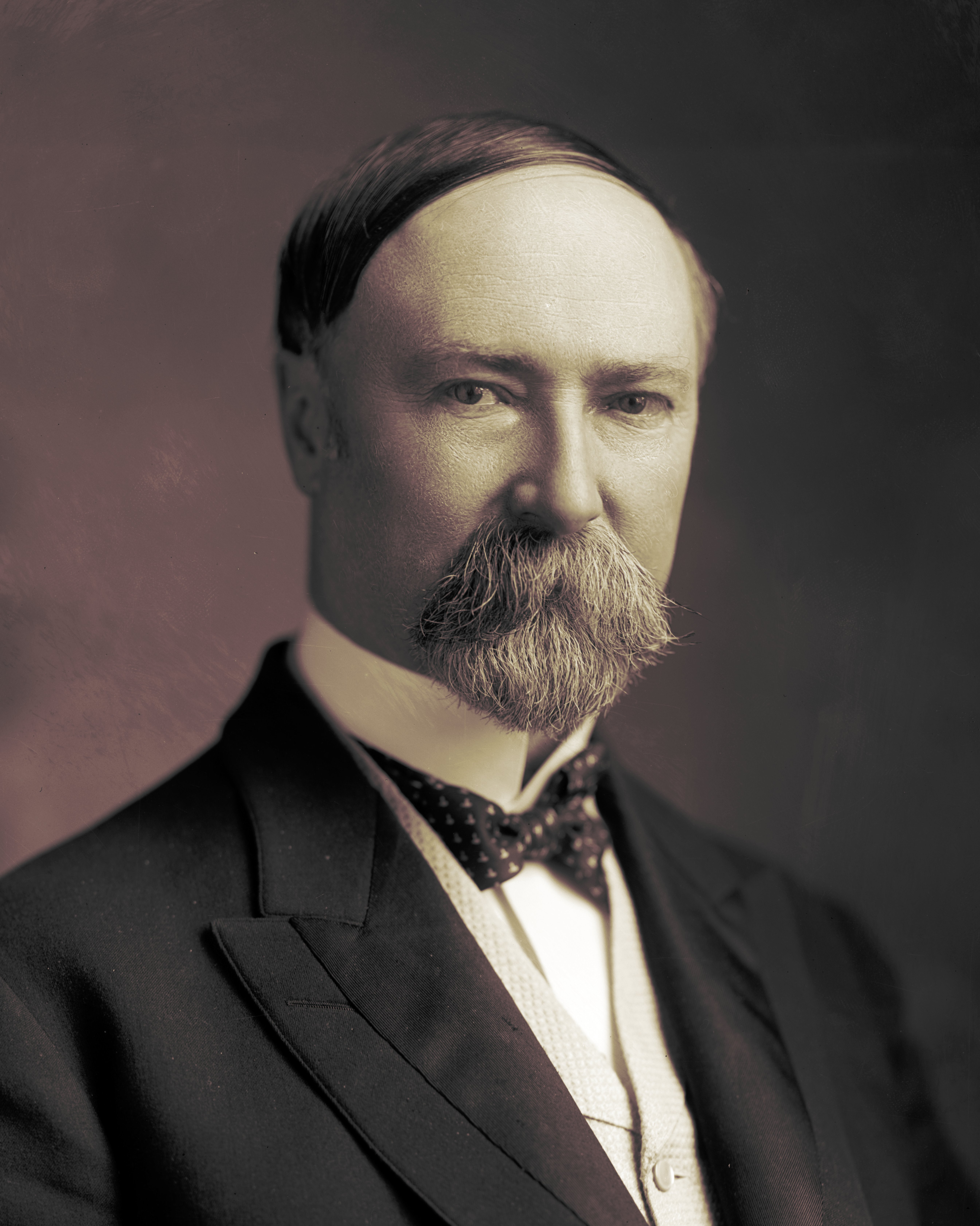
Senator
Charles W. Fairbanks
of Indiana

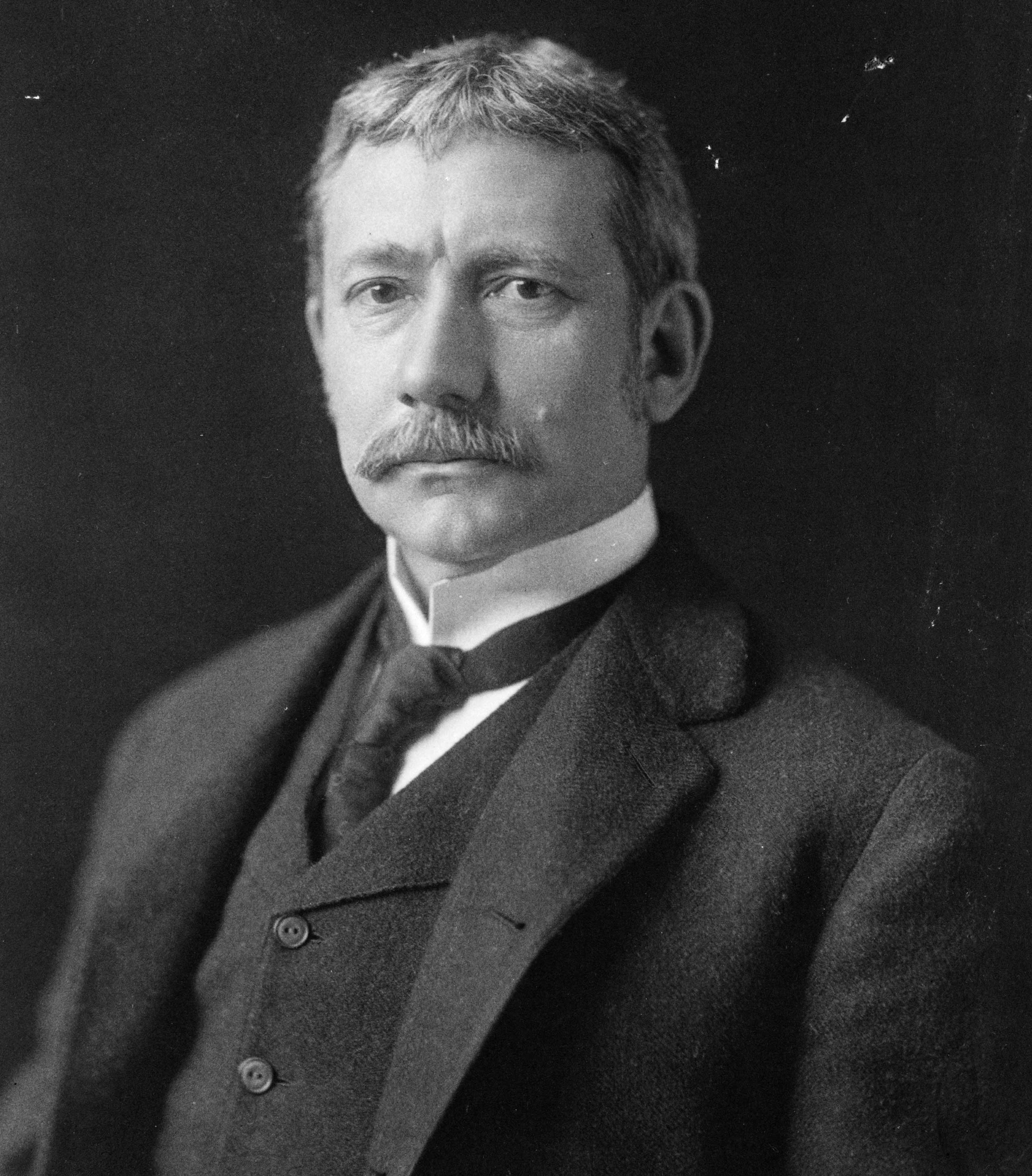
Secretary of War
Elihu Root
of New York

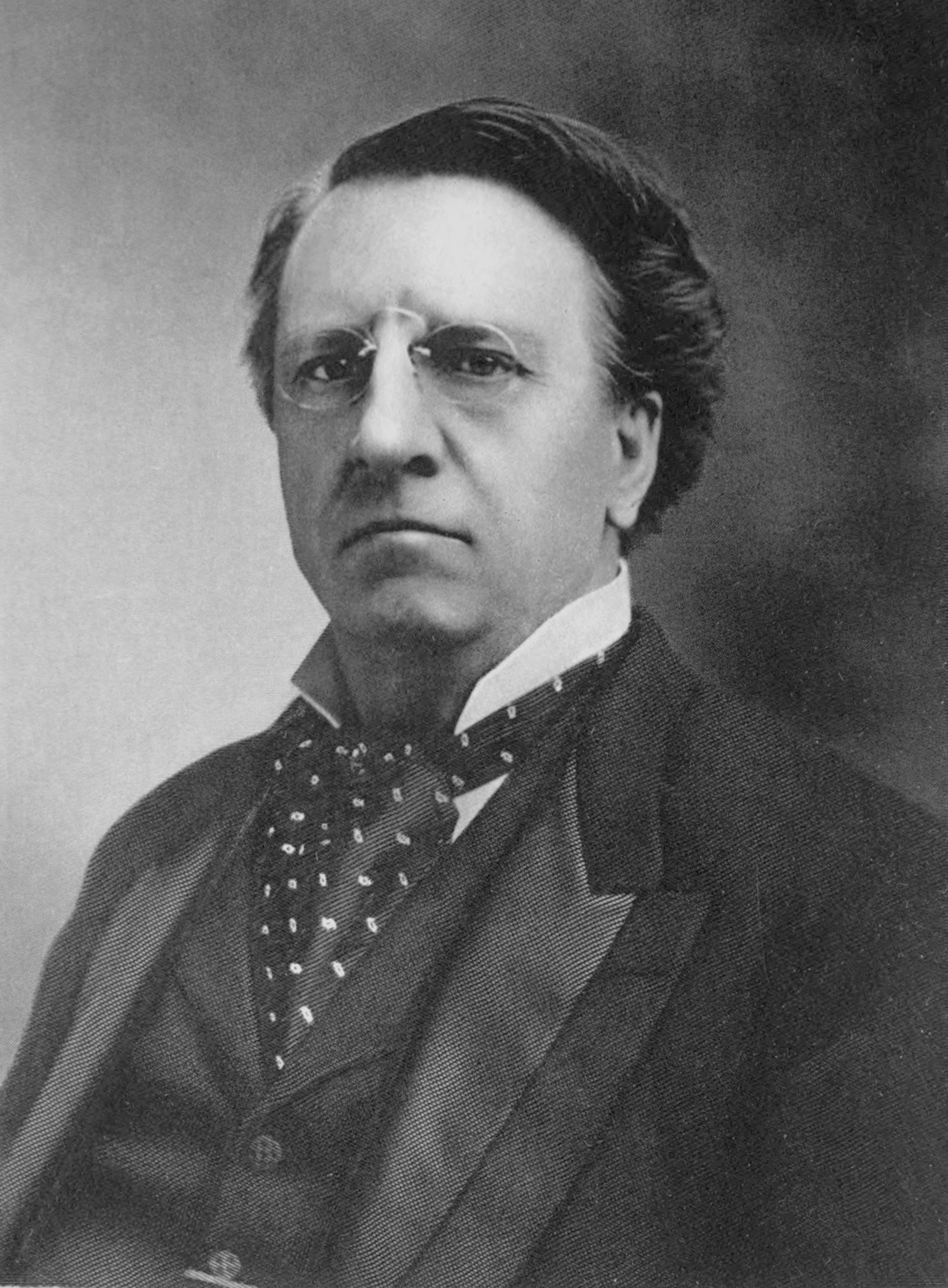
Senator
John C. Spooner
of Wisconsin

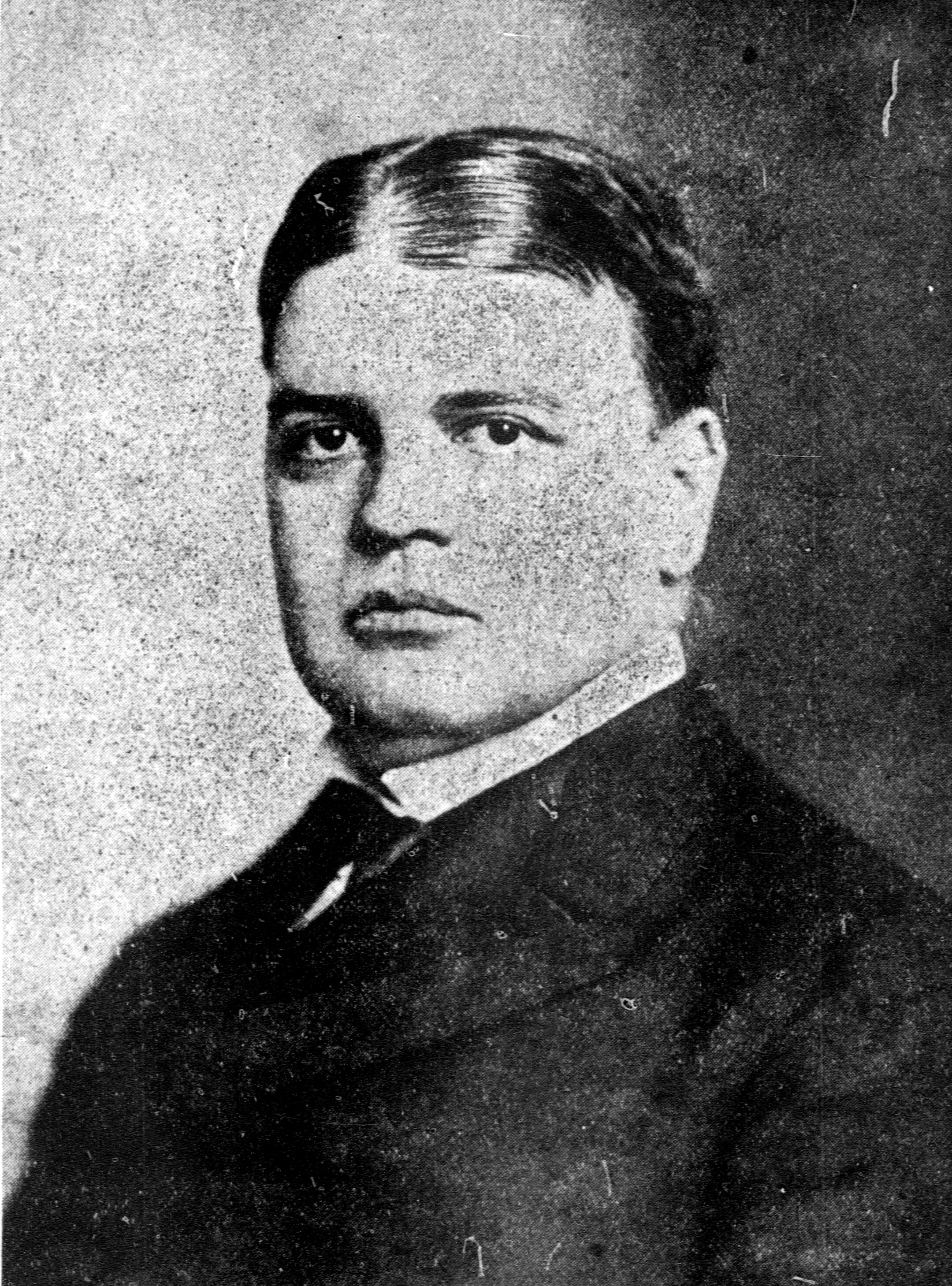
Lieutenant Governor
Timothy L. Woodruff
of New York

Vice President Garret Hobart had announced in September 1899 that he would not seek re-election due to declining health. He died in office on November 21, 1899.

Entering the convention, many had expected that the ticket would consist of President McKinley and New York Governor Theodore Roosevelt. Roosevelt's nomination was spearheaded by bosses Matthew Quay of Pennsylvania and Thomas C. Platt of New York; bcause Roosevelt was a progressive reformer who often clashed with Platt, Platt hoped to remove him as governor by elevating him to the vice presidency. However, Ohio Senator Mark Hanna maneuvered to keep Roosevelt off the ballot, instead proposing Navy Secretary John D. Long of Massachusetts or Iowa Representative Jonathan P. Dolliver. Without McKinley's support, Hanna's efforts fell short. Roosevelt himself did not particularly want to abandon the governorship, but he desired to run for president in 1904, so when the party nominated him, he accepted.

Vice Presidential Balloting
Candidate	1st
Roosevelt	925
Not Voting	1

Vice-presidential balloting / 3rd day of convention (June 21, 1900)

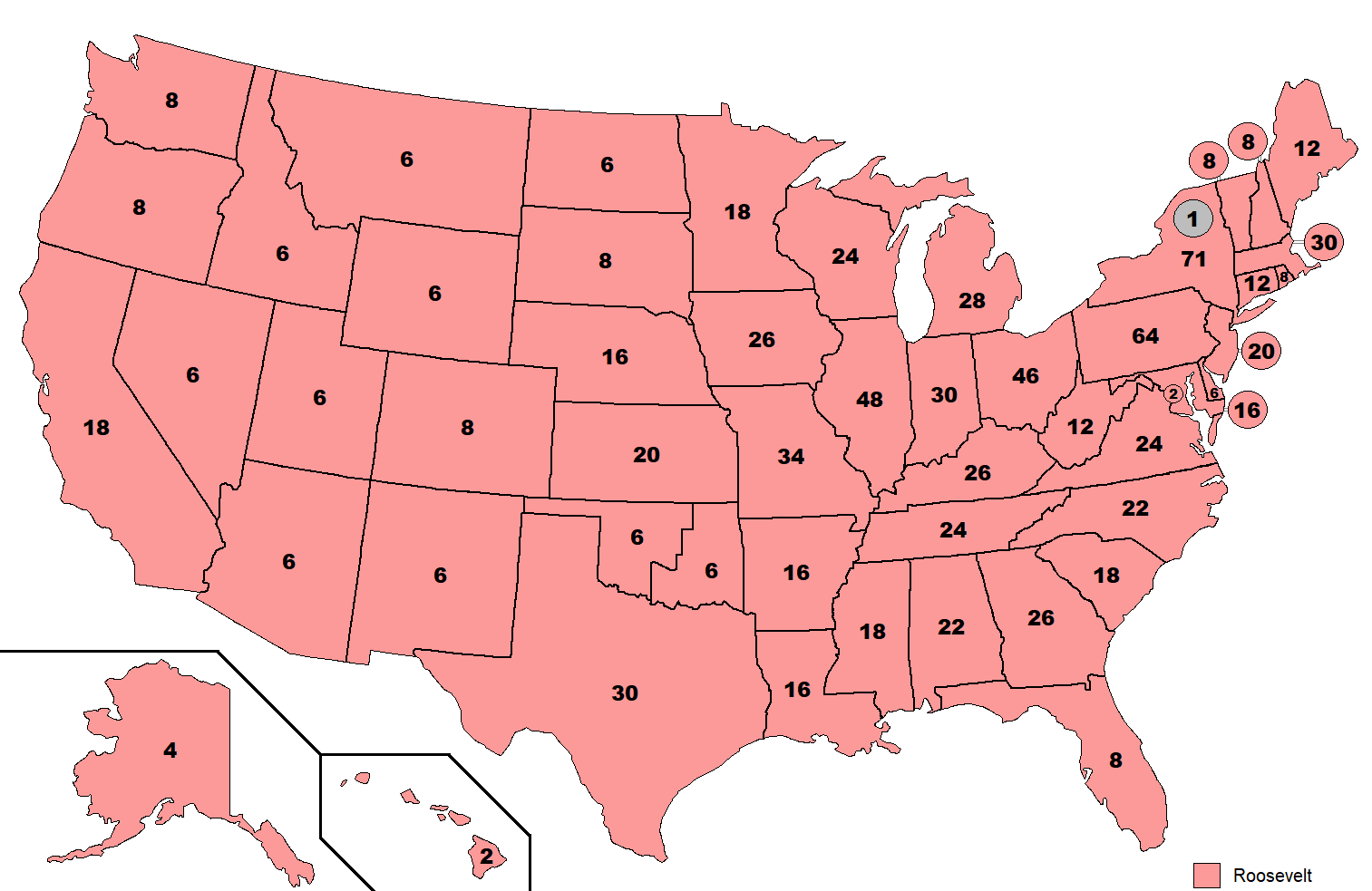
1st
Vice-presidential ballot

== Platform ==
The Republican party supported the current administration's actions in the Philippines, while the Democratic party promoted "anti-imperialism".

== See also ==
- History of the United States Republican Party
- List of Republican National Conventions
- United States presidential nominating convention
- 1900 United States presidential election
- 1900 Democratic National Convention

Preceded by 1896; St. Louis, Missouri	Republican National Conventions	Succeeded by 1904; Chicago, Illinois
