= 1896 New York state election =

1896 New York gubernatorial election
- November 3, 1896
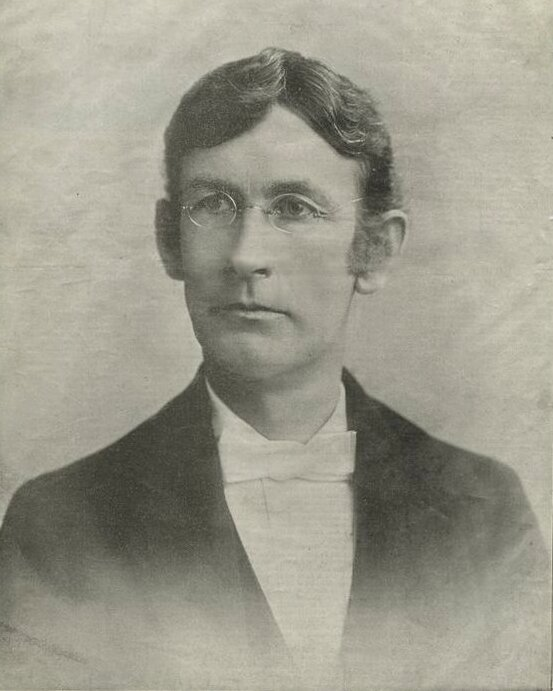

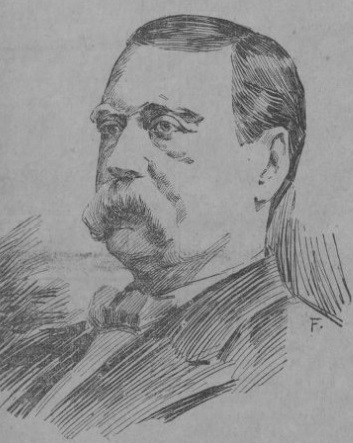
Nominee	Frank S. Black	Wilbur F. Porter
Party	Republican	Democratic
Alliance		Populist
Popular vote	787,516	574,524
Percentage	55.28%	40.33%
- County results Black: 40–50% 50–60% 60–70% 70–80% Porter: 50–60%
Governor before election
Levi P. Morton
Republican
Elected Governor
Frank S. Black
Republican

The 1896 New York state election was held on November 3, 1896, to elect the governor, the lieutenant governor and a judge of the New York Court of Appeals, as well as all members of the New York State Assembly. Besides, a constitutional amendment on forestry was proposed, and rejected with 321,486 votes for and 710,505 against it.

== History ==
The Democratic state convention met on September 17 at Buffalo, New York, and endorsed the Free Silver platform of the Democratic national convention. Mayor of Albany John Boyd Thacher, a Gold Democrat, was nominated for governor on the first ballot (vote: Thacher 332, William Sulzer (Free Silver) 88, Wilbur F. Porter 20). Wilbur F. Porter (Free Silver) for lieutenant governor, and Robert C. Titus for the Court of Appeals, were nominated by acclamation. Thacher declined to run, and the Democratic State Committee met on September 28 at the Hotel Bartholdi in New York City, Elliott Danforth presided. They moved Porter one step up, and substituted Frederick C. Schraub (Free Silver) on the ticket for lieutenant governor.

== Result ==
The whole Republican ticket was elected.

The incumbent Vann was re-elected.

At this time, automatic "ballot status" required 10,000 votes, which was reached by all parties.

A total of 9,497 blank, void, and scattering ballots are excluded from the infobox below:

1896 New York gubernatorial election
Party	Candidate	Votes	%	±%
Republican	Frank S. Black (incumbent)	787,516	55.28%	N/A
Democratic	Wilbur F. Porter	574,524	40.33%	N/A
National Democratic	Daniel C. Griffin	26,698	1.87%	N/A
Socialist Labor	Howard Balkam	18,362	1.29%	N/A
Prohibition	William W. Smith	17,419	1.22%	N/A
Total votes		1,484,046	100.00%	

1896 state election results
Office	Republican ticket		Democratic ticket		National Democratic ticket		Socialist Labor ticket		Prohibition ticket		People's ticket	
Governor	Frank S. Black	787,516	Wilbur F. Porter	574,524	Daniel G. Griffin	26,698	Howard Balkam	18,362	William W. Smith	17,449	Wilbur F. Porter	
Lieutenant Governor	Timothy L. Woodruff	793,845	Frederick C. Schraub	565,063	Frederick W. Hinrichs	25,593	Frederick Bennets	18,673	Charles E. Latimer	17,136	Fred C. Schraub	4,172
Judge of the Court of Appeals	Irving G. Vann	799,122	Robert C. Titus	555,942	Spencer Clinton	23,585	Theodore F. Cuno	18,710	Elias Root	17,205	Lawrence J. McParlin	8,344

Obs.: For candidates nominated on more than one ticket, the numbers are the total votes on all tickets.

== See also ==
- New York gubernatorial elections

== Sources ==
- A ballot from Orange County at Hudson River Valley Heritage
- The tickets: ALL STATES WILL VOTE in NYT on November 2, 1896
- The candidates: CANDIDATES FOR ELECTION in NYT on November 1, 1896
- Result in New York City: CITY'S OFFICIAL COUNT in NYT on November 22, 1896
- Result: THE VOTE OF NEW YORK; DECLARED BY THE STATE BOARD OF CANVASSERS in NYT on December 16, 1896
- Result: The Tribune Almanac 1897
