= William Horace Hotchkiss =

American legal writer

William Horace Hotchkiss (September 7, 1864 – June 6, 1950) was an author of legal textbooks on bankruptcy law and Superintendent of Insurance for the State of New York.

== Biography ==
Hotchkiss was born in Whitehall, New York, on September 7, 1864, the son of Mason King Hotchkiss and Rachel Amanda Merriam Hotchkiss. He attended schools in Albany and graduated from Hamilton College in 1886. Upon leaving college he read law with the Hon. John D. Teller of Auburn, New York, and acted as Clerk of the Surrogate's Court of Cayuga County, New York from 1887 to 1889. In 1888, he was admitted to the New York State Bar Association.

In 1891, he went to Buffalo, New York and engaged there in the practice of the law. In 1895, he married Miss Katherine Tremain Bush, of Ithaca, New York. They had two surviving daughters, Katherine and Emily.

He was appointed Referee in Bankruptcy in 1898 and was reappointed in 1900 and served in that capacity up to the time of his appointment as Superintendent of Insurance. He was regarded as an authority on bankruptcy laws and was president of the National Association of Referees in Bankruptcy. He was a lecturer on bankruptcy laws in law schools of Buffalo and New York, and in Cornell University.

In 1907, Charles Evans Hughes appointed him a Commissioner for the Promotion of Uniformity of Legislation in the United States.

With other Buffalo Republicans he made an inquiry regarding the operation of the primary election law of the State of New York and a report was drawn up which led to the introduction of a bill in the Legislature concerning the subject. In 1899, in association with Elihu Root and Paul D. Cravath of New York, Hotchkiss prepared the Primary Election Law of 1899.

He was President of the American Automobile Association, the New York State Automobile Association and of the Buffalo Automobile Club. He prepared the automobile law of the State.

Hotchkiss died on June 6, 1950, and is buried in Kensico Cemetery, Valhalla, Westchester County, New York.
