= Joseph Bradford Carr =

Union Army general (1828–1895)

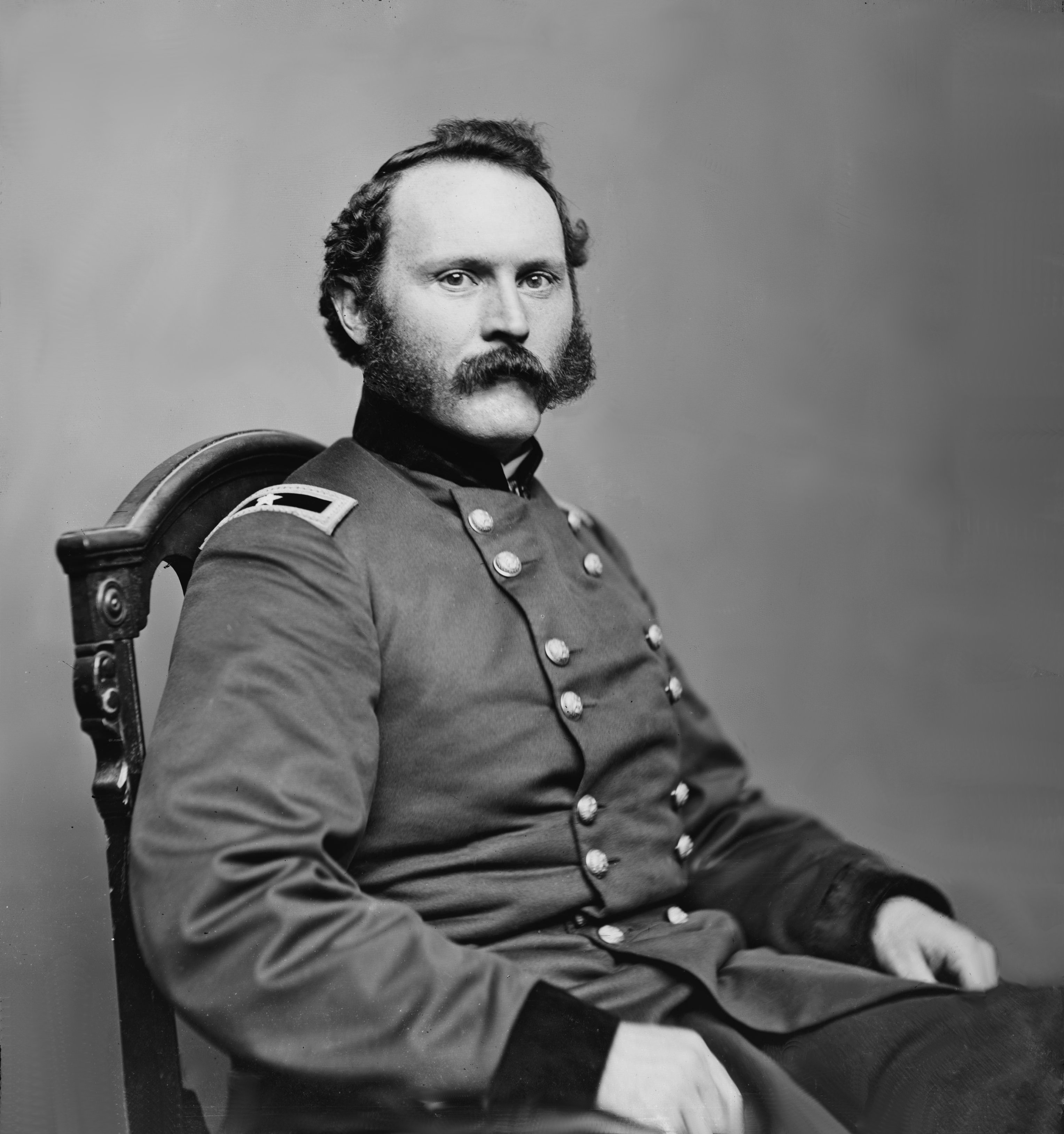
- Joseph Bradford Carr

Secretary of State of New York
- In office 1880–1885
- Governor: Alonzo B. Cornell; Grover Cleveland; David B. Hill
- Preceded by: Allen C. Beach
- Succeeded by: Frederick Cook

Personal details
- Born: August 16, 1828 Albany, New York
- Died: February 24, 1895 (aged 66) Troy, New York

Military service
- Allegiance: United States of America; Union
- Branch/service: United States Army; Union Army
- Years of service: 1861–1865
- Rank: Brevet Major General
- Battles/wars: American Civil War

Joseph Bradford Carr (August 16, 1828 – February 24, 1895) was a general in the Union Army during the American Civil War.

== Early life ==
Carr was born in Albany, New York, the son of Irish immigrants, and worked as a tobacconist. While living in Troy, New York, he became interested in military affairs and by 1861 was a colonel in the New York militia.

== Civil War ==
At the start of the war, Carr was instrumental in the recruitment of the 2nd New York Volunteer Infantry Regiment and was appointed its colonel on May 14, 1861. Assigned to Fort Monroe, Virginia, the regiment took part in the engagement at Big Bethel. Carr served in the Army of the Potomac throughout the Peninsula Campaign and Seven Days Battles as well as the Northern Virginia Campaign. As a brigade commander in the III Corps, General Carr participated in the battles of Fredericksburg and Chancellorsville (commanding a division during a part of the latter after the death of Hiram Berry).

Carr was promoted to brigadier general on September 7, 1862, for gallantry at Malvern Hill, but this promotion was plagued by procedural difficulties. His first appointment was returned to the president on February 12, 1863. He was reappointed on March 30, 1863, but the United States Senate failed to confirm the commission in the session in which he was nominated and it expired on March 30, 1864. He was renominated on April 9, 1864, and confirmed on June 30, 1864, with a date of rank of March 30, 1863.

He was distinguished for gallantry at Gettysburg, where he was wounded and his men stubbornly held their ground near the Peach Orchard. He commanded the 3rd Division of III Corps in the autumn campaigns of 1863. Because of the difficulties with his brigadier general appointment, he was technically junior to his own subordinate brigade commanders and on May 2, 1864, Lt. Gen. Ulysses S. Grant reassigned Carr to the Army of the James under Maj. Gen. Benjamin Butler. Carr commanded a division of African-American soldiers in the XVIII Corps and briefly commanded the Defenses of Yorktown in the Department of Virginia and North Carolina. On March 13, 1865, Carr was appointed a brevet major general of volunteers, and he was mustered out of the volunteer service on August 24.

== Postbellum career and death ==
After the close of the war, Carr became a manufacturer in Troy, New York, then a Republican politician for New York State. He served as Secretary of State of New York from 1880 to 1885, elected in 1879, 1881, and 1883. In 1885, he ran on the Republican ticket for Lieutenant Governor of New York with Ira Davenport, but was defeated by Democrat Edward F. Jones. Carr died in Troy, New York, and is buried there in Oakwood Cemetery.

Actress Laura Prepon is his great-great-great granddaughter.

== See also ==
- List of American Civil War generals (Union)

== Notes ==
Political offices
| Preceded by Allen C. Beach | Secretary of State of New York; 1880 - 1885 | Succeeded by Frederick Cook |
