= 1883 New York state election =

1881 New York state election
- November 6, 1883

The 1883 New York state election was held on November 6, 1883, to elect the Secretary of State, the State Comptroller, the Attorney General, the State Treasurer and the State Engineer, as well as all members of the New York State Assembly and the New York State Senate. Besides, a constitutional amendment to abolish contract labor from the state prisons was proposed and accepted with 498,402 votes for and 269,377 against.

== History ==
The Greenback-Labor state convention met on September 5, and nominated Thomas K. Beecher for Secretary of State, Louis A. Post for Attorney General, Gaius L. Halsey for Comptroller, Jurian Winne for Treasurer and Edwin A. Stillman for State Engineer.

The Republican state convention met on September 19 at Richfield Springs, New York. Elbridge G. Lapham was Temporary Chairman until the choice of Warner Miller as President. The incumbents, Secretary of State Joseph B. Carr, Comptroller Ira Davenport, State Engineer Silas Seymour and Attorney General Leslie W. Russell, were re-nominated by acclamation. Pliny T. Sexton was nominated for Treasurer on the first ballot (vote: Sexton 260, Ethan Allen 215).

The Prohibition state convention met on September 26 at Syracuse, New York, and nominated Frederick Gates for Secretary of State, Stephen Merritt for Comptroller, James Baldwin for Treasurer, George A. Dudley for State Engineer and Virgil A. Willard for Attorney General.

The Democratic state convention met on September 27 at Buffalo, New York.

== Results ==
The incumbents Carr and Maxwell were re-elected. The incumbents Davenport, Russell and Seymour were defeated.

1883 state election results
Office	Democratic ticket		Republican ticket		Prohibition ticket		Greenback ticket	
Secretary of State	Isaac H. Maynard	427,525	Joseph B. Carr	446,108	Frederick Gates	18,816	Thomas K. Beecher	7,221
Comptroller	Alfred C. Chapin	445,975	Ira Davenport	429,873	Stephen Merritt	18,311	Gaius L. Halsey	7,629
Attorney General	Denis O'Brien	443,824	Leslie W. Russell	430,058	Virgil A. Willard	19,571	Louis F. Post	7,217
Treasurer	Robert A. Maxwell	446,618	Pliny T. Sexton	428,923	James Baldwin	19,971	Jurian Winne	7,239
State Engineer	Elnathan Sweet	447,198	Silas Seymour	428,327	George A. Dudley	19,692	Edwin A. Stillman	6,664

== See also ==
- New York state elections

== Sources ==
- The tickets: CANDIDATES IN NEW-YORK in NYT on November 5, 1883
- Result: COMPLETE VOTE OF THE STATE AS CANVASSED BY THE COUNTY SUPERVISORS in NYT on November 23, 1883
- Result: The Tribune Almanac 1884
- A possible explanation for Maynards defeat: DEMOCRATS WILL CUT COOK, BECAUSE HE AND HIS FRIENDS SLAUGHTERED JUDGE MAYNARD TWO YEARS AGO in NYT on October 30, 1885
