= Senator Schoonmaker =

Senator Schoonmaker may refer to:

- Augustus Schoonmaker Jr. (1828–1894), New York State Senate
- Marius Schoonmaker (1811–1894), New York State Senate
