= 1881 New York state election =

- November 8, 1881

The 1881 New York state election was held on November 8, 1881, to elect the Secretary of State, the State Comptroller, the Attorney General, the State Treasurer, the State Engineer and a judge of the New York Court of Appeals, as well as all members of the New York State Assembly and the New York State Senate.

== Nominations ==
The Greenback-Labor state convention met on August 24 at Elmira, New York. Mr. Furbish was Temporary and Permanent Chairman. All candidates were nominated by acclamation.

The Prohibition state convention met on September 15 at Utica, New York and nominated Stephen Merritt for Secretary of State; Jefferson Bissell, of Steuben County, for Comptroller; Frederick Gates for Treasurer; George Brooks, of Otsego County, for Attorney General; John J. Hooker, of Tioga County, for State Engineer; and Walter Farrington for Judge of the Court of Appeals.

The Republican state convention met on October 5. The incumbent Secretary of State Joseph B. Carr was re-nominated by acclamation. Ira Davenport was nominated for Comptroller on the first ballot (vote: Davenport 290, Henry L. Duguid 191). Leslie W. Russell was nominated for Attorney General on the first ballot (vote: Russell 255, Hamilton Ward, Sr. [incumbent] 231). James W. Husted was nominated for Treasurer during the first ballot. Ex-State Engineer Silas Seymour (in office 1856–1857) was nominated again for this office, and Francis M. Finch, who had been appointed to the Court of Appeals to fill the vacancy caused by the election of Charles J. Folger as Chief Judge, was nominated to succeed himself, both by acclamation.

The Democratic state convention met on October 11 and 12 at Albany, New York. The Tammany delegates were not admitted and left the convention. Erastus Brooks was chosen Permanent Chairman. William Purcell, of Rochester, was nominated for Secretary of State on the first ballot (vote: Purcell 258, Charles Hughes 96, R. S. Stevens 14). George H. Lapham, of Yates County, was nominated for Comptroller by acclamation. Roswell A. Parmenter, of Troy, was nominated for Attorney General on the first ballot (vote: Parmenter 221, James W. Covert 57, J. Thomas Spriggs 55, Ruggles 21, Lewis L. Bundy 16). Robert A. Maxwell was nominated after the roll was, amid some confusion, called twice for the first ballot (vote Maxwell 197, H. Catlin 187). Thomas Evershed, of Orleans County, was nominated for State Engineer by a rising vote. Augustus Schoonmaker, Jr., was nominated for the Court of Appeals during the first ballot when the name of William C. Ruger was withdrawn.

== Results ==
Almost the whole Republican ticket was elected. Only Robert A. Maxwell managed to be elected on the Democratic ticket.

The incumbents Carr and Finch were re-elected.

1881 state election results
Office	Republican ticket		Democratic ticket		Greenback ticket		Prohibition ticket	
Secretary of State	Joseph B. Carr	416,915	William Purcell	403,893	Epenetus Howe	16,018	Stephen Merritt	4,445
Comptroller	Ira Davenport	417,460	George H. Lapham	403,385	John Hooper	14,878	Jefferson Bissell	4,166
Attorney General	Leslie W. Russell	416,337	Roswell A. Parmenter	403,704	Dennis C. Feely	16,124	George Brooks	4,238
Treasurer	James W. Husted	392,148	Robert A. Maxwell	413,341	Allen C. Wood	15,499	Frederick Gates	4,334
State Engineer	Silas Seymour	413,430	Thomas Evershed	406,711	James H. Gould	15,919	John J. Hooker	4,276
Judge of the Court of Appeals	Francis M. Finch	415,410	Augustus Schoonmaker, Jr.	403,799	Lawrence J. McParlin	15,275	Walter Farrington	3,855

== See also ==
- New York state elections

== Sources ==
- Result for Secretary of State: THE NOVEMBER ELECTIONS in NYT on November 5, 1883 (recalling the previous result)
- Result for Rep., Dem., and Howe: OFFICIAL VOTE FOR STATE OFFICERS AS CANVASSED BY THE COUNTY SUPERVISORS in NYT on November 27, 1881
- Result: The Tribune Almanac 1882
