= Horace B. Smith =

American politician (1826–1888)

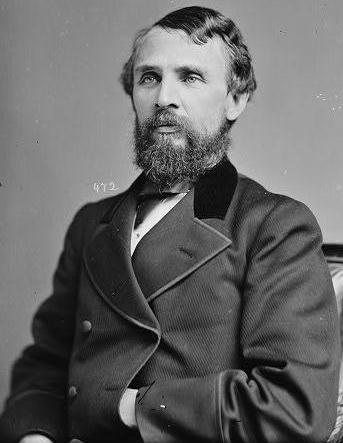

Member of the U.S. House of Representatives from New York's 27th district
- In office March 4, 1871 – March 3, 1875
- Preceded by: Hamilton Ward Sr.
- Succeeded by: Thomas C. Platt

Personal details
- Born: Horace Boardman Smith; August 18, 1826 Whitingham, Vermont, U.S.
- Died: December 26, 1888 (aged 62) Elmira, New York, U.S.
- Resting place: Woodlawn Cemetery
- Party: Republican
- Education: Williams College
- Occupation: Politician, lawyer, judge

Horace Boardman Smith (August 18, 1826 – December 26, 1888) was a U.S. representative from New York.

Born in Whitingham, Vermont, Smith pursued classical studies and graduated from Williams College, Williamstown, Massachusetts, in 1847. He studied law. He was admitted to the bar in 1850 and began practice in Elmira, New York. Held several local offices. He served as judge of Chemung County in 1859 and 1860.

Smith was elected as a Republican to the Forty-second and Forty-third Congresses (March 4, 1871 – March 3, 1875). He served as chairman of the Committee on Elections (Forty-third Congress). He was not a candidate for renomination in 1874. He resumed the practice of law in Elmira, New York, until 1883. He served as justice of the supreme court of New York State 1883-1888. He retired to his home at Elmira, where he died on December 26, 1888. He was interred in Woodlawn Cemetery.

== Sources ==
- United States Congress. "Horace B. Smith (id: S000552)". Biographical Directory of the United States Congress.

U.S. House of Representatives
Preceded by Hamilton Ward	Member of the U.S. House of Representatives from New York's 27th congressional district 1871–1875	Succeeded by Thomas C. Platt
