= Elnathan Sweet =

American civil engineer and politician (1837–1903)

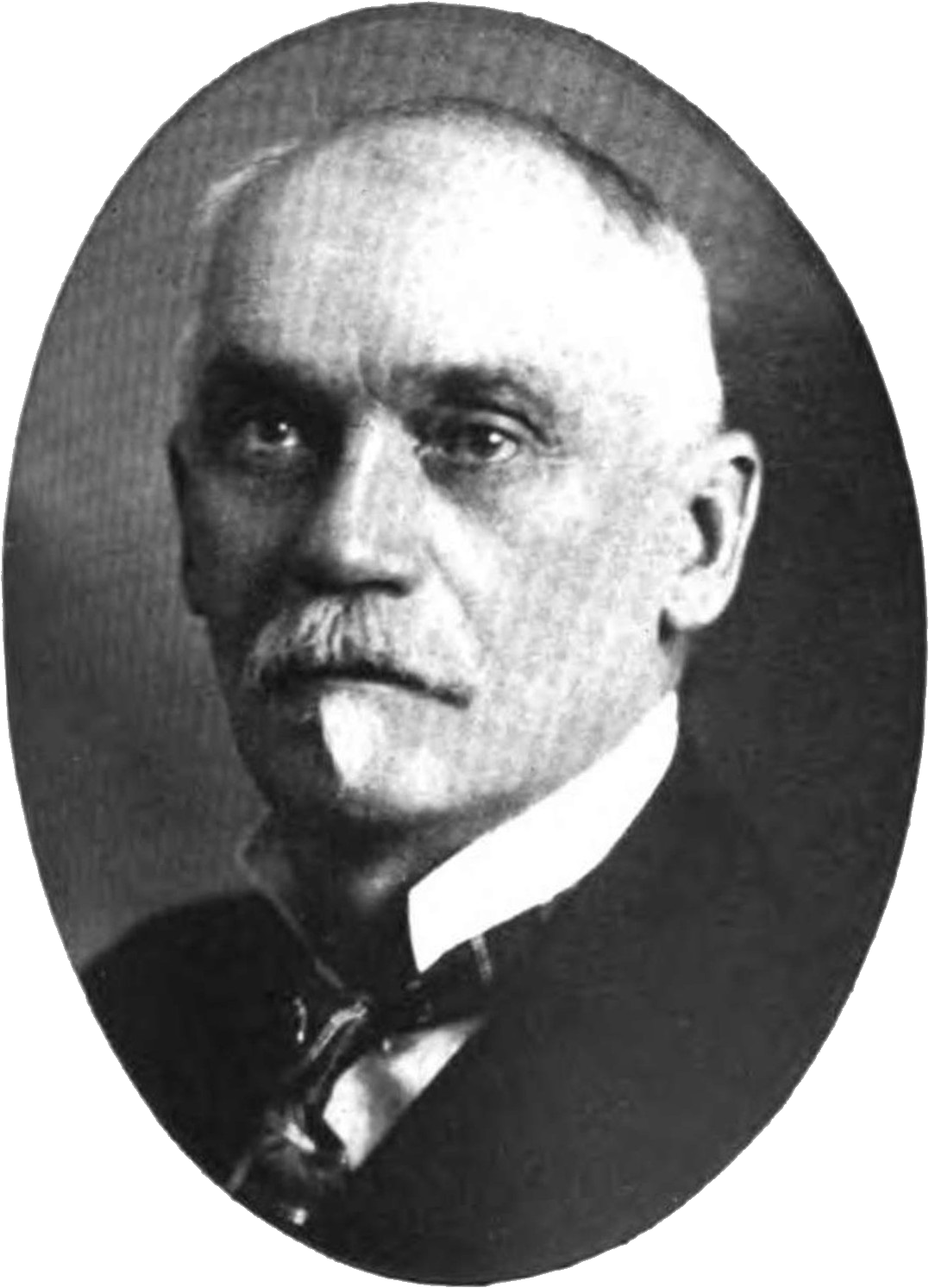
- Born: November 20, 1837; Cheshire, Massachusetts, U.S.
- Died: January 26, 1903 (aged 65); Albany, New York, U.S.

Elnathan Sweet (November 20, 1837 – January 26, 1903) was an American civil engineer and politician from New York. He was New York State Engineer and Surveyor from 1884 to 1887. He is credited with constructing the first cantilever arch bridge.

== Biography ==
Sweet was born on November 20, 1837, in Cheshire, Massachusetts. His father was a Baptist minister. His family moved to Stephentown, New York, in 1842.

He graduated with a degree in civil engineering from Union College in 1859, and began work as Deputy Surveyor under Ward B. Burnet, Surveyor General of the Kansas and Nebraska Territories. He soon returned to New York and was employed as Assistant Engineer in various railway companies. From 1864 to 1868, he was at Franklin, Pennsylvania, engaged in the engineering development of oil wells and coal mines. In 1869, he removed to Chicago, and became Chief Engineer of the Rock Island and Quincy Railroad, later a part of the Chicago, Burlington and Quincy Railroad. In 1871, he became also Consulting Engineer for the Rockford Central Railroad and the Cairo and St. Louis Railroad, and engaged in railway construction with his partner James R. Young.

In 1875, he was a member of the Tilden Commission which investigated alleged canal frauds. He was appointed Division Engineer of the Eastern Division of the New York State Canals in 1876. He resigned in 1880, and resumed his railway construction business with his former partner, James R. Young.

He was New York State Engineer and Surveyor from 1884 to 1887, elected on the Democratic ticket in 1883 and 1885. Upon retiring from public office, he returned to private practice where, as president of the Hilton Bridge Construction Company, his company landed a State contract to design and construct what would become the Hawk Street Viaduct in Albany. He was also, for a time, president of the Canton Bridge Company.

In 1897 he was appointed as receiver for the Lebanon Springs Railroad following the death of William V. V. Reynolds.

In 1900, he was President of the Advisory Commission of Engineers, appointed by State Engineer Edward A. Bond to advise in the conduct of surveys for a thousand-ton barge canal. Later he was a member of the New York Water Storage Commission.

Sweet died from heart disease at the Fort Orange Club in Albany, New York, on January 26, 1903, at age 65. He was interred at Albany Rural Cemetery.

== Legacy ==
Of those engineering projects with which Sweet was directly involved, the Hawk Street Viaduct may have had the most lasting and widespread impact. Sweet's novel design, likely the first cantilever arch bridge, was replicated across America and Europe. In the years following its completion, major cantilever arch bridges were erected over the Seine and Viaur in France, the Elbe–Lübeck Canal at Mölln in Germany, and on railways in Alaska and Costa Rica.

His principal contribution to engineering science was the determination of the laws that govern the propulsion of vessels in narrow channels, an account of which he published in 1880 in the Transactions of the American Society of Civil Engineers of which organization he was elected a member in 1878.

Political offices
Preceded by Silas Seymour	New York State Engineer and Surveyor; 1884 – 1887	Succeeded by John Bogart
