= Newton Martin Curtis =

American politician

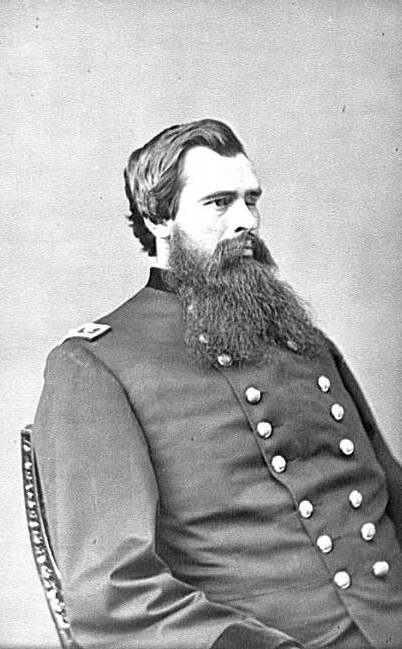

Chairman of the United States House Committee on the Election of the President, Vice President and Representatives in Congress
- In office 1895–1897

Member of the U.S. House of Representatives from New York's 22nd district
- In office November 3, 1891 – March 3, 1897
- Preceded by: Leslie W. Russell
- Succeeded by: Lucius Littauer

New York State Assembly (St. Lawrence Co., 1st D.)
- In office 1884–1890

Personal details
- Born: May 21, 1835 De Peyster, New York
- Died: January 8, 1910 (aged 74) New York City, New York
- Party: Republican

Military service
- Allegiance: United States of America; Union
- Branch/service: United States Army; Union Army
- Years of service: 1861–1866
- Rank: Brigadier General; Brevet Major General
- Unit: 16th New York Infantry
- Commands: 142nd New York Volunteer Infantry; 1st Brigade, 2nd Division, X Corps
- Battles/wars: American Civil War
- Awards: Medal of Honor

Newton Martin Curtis (May 21, 1835 – January 8, 1910) was a Union officer during the American Civil War and a member of the United States House of Representatives from New York.

== Early life ==
Curtis was born in De Peyster, New York. Upon graduating from the Gouverneur Wesleyan Seminary, Curtis became a teacher, lawyer, and postmaster of De Peyster. In the year prior to the Civil War, he was working as a farmer.

Curtis stood an impressive 6' 7" tall and weighed 225 pounds. His enormous size for the time period prompted even Abraham Lincoln to quip, "Mr. Curtis, how do you know when your feet are cold?" His stature became an issue of concern to his family when the Civil War began, as they felt he would surely be an easy target for enemy bullets.

== Civil War ==
On May 15, 1861, Curtis volunteered in the Union Army as a captain in Company G of the 16th New York Infantry. He fought in the Peninsula Campaign and was wounded in a minor engagement at West Point, Virginia. On October 23, 1862, he transferred to the 142nd New York Volunteer Infantry, serving as lieutenant colonel until his promotion to colonel on January 21, 1865. As commander of the 142nd New York Infantry, he fought in the Bermuda Hundred Campaign of May 1864. He took command of the 1st Brigade, 2nd Division, X Corps, during the Siege of Petersburg. Curtis received a brevet promotion to brigadier general on October 28, 1864, for his actions at the Battle of New Market Heights.

His brigade became part of the expedition against Fort Fisher in December 1864. Curtis' brigade was among the few troops to go ashore yet the first attack against Fort Fisher was defeated. He took part in the second attack in January 1865, in which his brigade played a key role in the Union victory. During the fighting a suggestion of entrenching reached Curtis. He angrily grabbed a handful of shovels and threw them over the traverse shouting "Dig Johnnies! I'm coming for you!" Curtis made good on his promise and continued the attack. He was wounded at the head of his brigade and received a full promotion to brigadier general of volunteers and was also received the Medal of Honor. He remained in the army until January 1866, receiving a brevet to major general of volunteers on March 13, 1865.

== Political career ==
After the war, Curtis was a collector of customs in the district of Oswegatchie, New York, in 1866 and then a Special Agent for the United States Treasury Department from 1867 until 1880. He was in the Department of Justice from 1880 until 1882. He was a member of the New York State Assembly (St. Lawrence Co., 1st D.) in 1884, 1885, 1886, 1887, 1888, 1889 and 1890.

Curtis was elected as a Republican to the 52nd Congress to fill the vacancy caused by the resignation of Leslie W. Russell. He was re-elected to the 53rd and 54th Congresses, holding office from November 3, 1891, to March 3, 1897. He was Chairman of the House Committee on the Election of the President, Vice President and Representatives in Congress (54th Congress).

== Later life and legacy ==
He wrote a book titled From Bull Run to Chancellorsville, published in 1906. In 1910, he was the assistant inspector general of the National Home for Disabled Volunteer Soldiers.

He was a companion of the New York Commandery of the Military Order of the Loyal Legion of the United States.

He died in New York City and is buried at Ogdensburg Cemetery in Ogdensburg, New York, where a statue stands in his honor.

The General Newton Martin Curtis Camp #142 of the Sons of Union Veterans of the Civil War was named for Curtis.

== Medal of Honor citation ==
At the Second Battle of Fort Fisher: the first man to pass through the stockade, he personally led each assault on the traverses and was 4 times wounded.

== See also ==
- List of American Civil War Medal of Honor recipients: A–F
- List of American Civil War generals (Union)
- Ogdensburg, New York : statue of Curtis

New York State Assembly
Preceded by Morell D. Beckwith	New York State Assembly; St. Lawrence County, 2nd District; 1884–1890	Succeeded by John C. Keeler
U.S. House of Representatives
Preceded by Leslie W. Russell	Member of the U.S. House of Representatives from New York's 22nd congressional district 1891–1897	Succeeded by Lucius N. Littauer
