= Arnot Ogden Medical Center =

New York (state) hospital system

Geography
- Location: Elmira, Chemung County, New York, United States
- Coordinates: 42°6′1″N 76°49′41″W

Organization
- Type: General

Services
- Beds: 256

History
- Former name: Arnot-Ogden Memorial Hospital
- Opened: 1888

Links
- Lists: Hospitals in New York State

Arnot Ogden Medical Center is a medical facility in Elmira, New York, previously known as Arnot-Ogden Memorial Hospital, founded in 1888.

== History ==
Construction of the Arnot-Ogden Memorial Hospital was completed in 1888. The former Arnot-Ogden Memorial Hospital is the anchor to Arnot Ogden Medical Center, which is part of Arnot Health. The latter is an umbrella organization that includes St. Joseph's Hospital (Elmira) and Ira Davenport Memorial Hospital.

In 2015 they added another floor; together with other renovations, the result enabled that about 90 percent of patient rooms are private. The hospital is among those that "cleaned up" their website's visitation policy based on federal patient rights that were updated in 2010 permitting the person who has been hospitalized to choose who may visit, rather than "family only."

The hospital was named as a Top 25 hospital in the State of New York in 2019.

== Controversy ==
The New York Times wrote in 1998 "The worst-performing hospital was Arnot Ogden Medical Center in Elmira" regarding "Death Rate from Bypass Surgery."

A physician who lied on an employment application in 2015 regarding data in state records, results of which included discharging a man "despite an irregular EKG reading" who, moments later died, was employed. A review found "either nobody checked or they were given wrong information."

== Graduate Medical Education ==
The hospital currently offers five residency programs in family medicine, internal medicine, emergency medicine, diagnostic radiology, transitional, and psychiatry." Accreditation for the general surgery residency was withdrawn in 2022 after warnings the two previous years.
