= Augustus Schoonmaker Jr. =

American politician

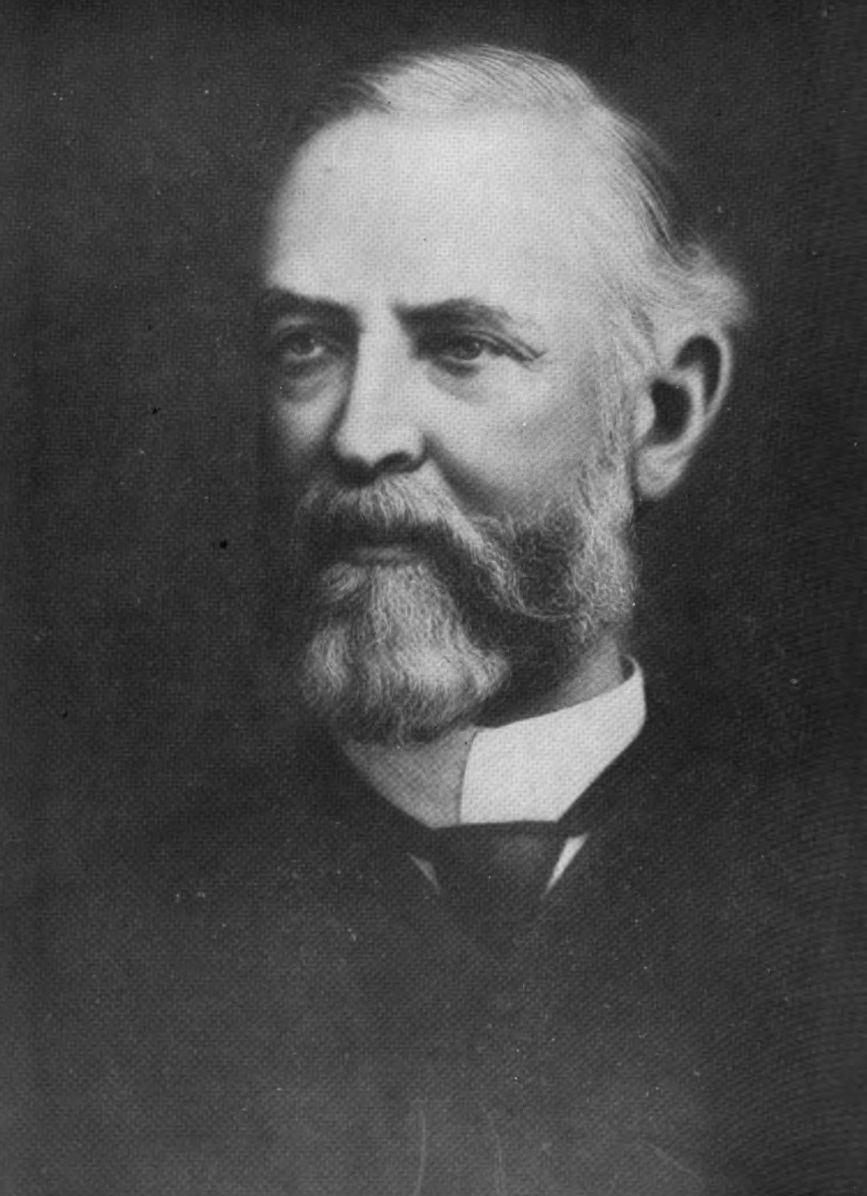
From 1946's The Lives of the Interstate Commerce Commissioners and the Commission's Secretaries

Augustus Schoonmaker Jr. (March 2, 1828 – April 9, 1894) was an American lawyer and Democratic politician.

== Life ==
Schoonmaker was born March 2, 1828, in the Town of Rochester in Ulster County, New York (not to be confused with the city of Rochester, New York which is significantly further west) to Hendricus Martin (1792-1870) and Jane (née Schoonmaker) Schoonmaker (1796-1866). His parents were second cousins, sharing the same great-grandparents, Jan and Margaret Hornbeck Schoonmaker.

Schoonmaker was originally a teacher and superintendent of schools in Ulster County. In 1853, he was admitted to the bar. He was County Judge in Ulster County from 1864 to 1872, and a member of the New York State Senate (14th D.) in 1876 and 1877.

He was New York Attorney General from 1878 to 1879, elected at the New York state election, 1877 on the Democratic ticket. At the New York state election, 1879, he was defeated for re-election by Republican Hamilton Ward Sr. At the New York state election, 1881, he ran for the New York Court of Appeals but was defeated by Republican Francis M. Finch.

Afterwards he served on the New York Board of Civil Service Commissioners (1883–1887) and was an original appointee of President Grover Cleveland to the Interstate Commerce Commission, serving from 1887 to 1890.

Schoonmaker died of tonsillitis on April 9, 1894, in Kingston.

He married Louise Cooper (1835-1910) and they are both buried in Wiltwyck Cemetery in Kingston.

New York State Senate
Preceded by Henry C. Connelly	New York State Senate; 14th District; 1876–1877	Succeeded by Addison P. Jones
Legal offices
Preceded by Charles S. Fairchild	New York State Attorney General; 1878–1879	Succeeded by Hamilton Ward Sr.
