= Leonard C. Crouch =

American judge

Leonard Callender Crouch (July 30, 1866 in Kingston, Ulster County, New York – July 2, 1953 in Falls Church, Virginia) was an American lawyer and politician.

== Life ==
He was the son of Henry Gage Crouch and Almira L. (Callender) Crouch. He graduated Ph.B. from Cornell University in 1889. He studied law at Syracuse University and was admitted to the bar in 1891. He commenced practice in Kingston, but soon removed to Syracuse, New York.

On May 13. 1913, he was appointed by Governor William Sulzer a justice of the New York Supreme Court (5th District) to fill the vacancy caused by the death of Peter B. McLennan. From 1923 on, he sat on the Appellate Division, Fourth Dept.

In 1928, he ran on the Democratic ticket for the New York Court of Appeals, but was defeated by Republican Irving G. Hubbs. On March 17, 1932, he was appointed by Governor Franklin D. Roosevelt to the Court of Appeals to fill the vacancy caused by the appointment of Cuthbert W. Pound as Chief Judge. Pound was elected Chief Judge in November 1932, and Crouch was re-appointed by Governor Herbert H. Lehman to the seat on January 1, 1933. In November 1933, Crouch was elected on the Democratic, Republican, Law Preservation and City Fusion tickets to succeed himself, and remained on the bench until the end of 1936 when he reached the constitutional age limit of 70 years.

In January 1933, his daughter Margaret (Crouch) Nottingham (born 1896) committed suicide by shooting herself.

Crouch died on July 2, 1953, at the home of his daughter Helen (Crouch) Douglass in Falls Church, Virginia, from heart disease; and was buried at the Oakwood Cemetery in Syracuse, New York.

== Sources ==
- The History of the New York Court of Appeals, 1932-2003 by Bernard S. Meyer, Burton C. Agata & Seth H. Agata (page 20)
- Court of Appeals judges [confusing Crouch and Kellogg]
- THREE JUSTICES NAMED in NYT on May 14, 1913
- CROUCH APPOINTED TO APPEALS BENCH in NYT on March 18, 1932 (subscription required)
- RENAMES CROUCH TO APPEALS COURT in NYT on January 2, 1933 (subscription required)
- JUDGE'S DAUGHTER SHOT in NYT on January 22, 1933 (subscription required)
- New York Court of Appeals biography
