= Denis O'Brien (politician) =

American judge (1837–1909)

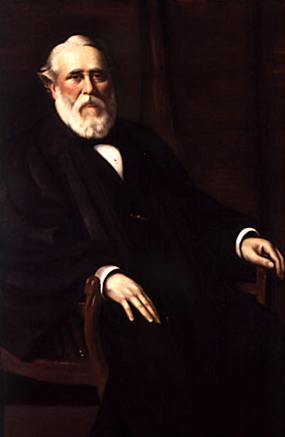

Judge of the New York Court of Appeals
- In office 1889–1907

New York State Attorney General
- In office January 1, 1884 – December 31, 1887
- Governor: Grover Cleveland; David B. Hill
- Preceded by: Leslie W. Russell
- Succeeded by: Charles F. Tabor

Personal details
- Born: March 13, 1837 Ogdensburg, New York
- Died: May 18, 1909 (aged 72) Watertown, New York
- Party: Democratic
- Occupation: Lawyer

Denis O'Brien (March 13, 1837 – May 18, 1909) was an American lawyer and politician.

== Life ==
Denis O'Brien was born on a farm near Ogdensburg, New York on March 13, 1837. He was admitted to the bar in 1861, and commenced practice in Watertown. He was elected Mayor of Watertown in 1872.

He was New York State Attorney General from 1884 to 1887, elected on the Democrat ticket in 1883 and 1885.

In 1889, he was elected a judge of the New York Court of Appeals, was re-elected in 1903, and remained on the bench until the end of 1907 when he reached the constitutional age limit of 70 years.

He died from appendicitis at his home in Watertown on May 18, 1909.

His son John F. O'Brien also was a judge of the New York Court of Appeals.

Legal offices
Preceded by Leslie W. Russell	New York State Attorney General; 1884–1887	Succeeded by Charles F. Tabor
