= Sheridan Hollow, Albany, New York =

Sheridan Hollow City of Albany
- Neighborhood
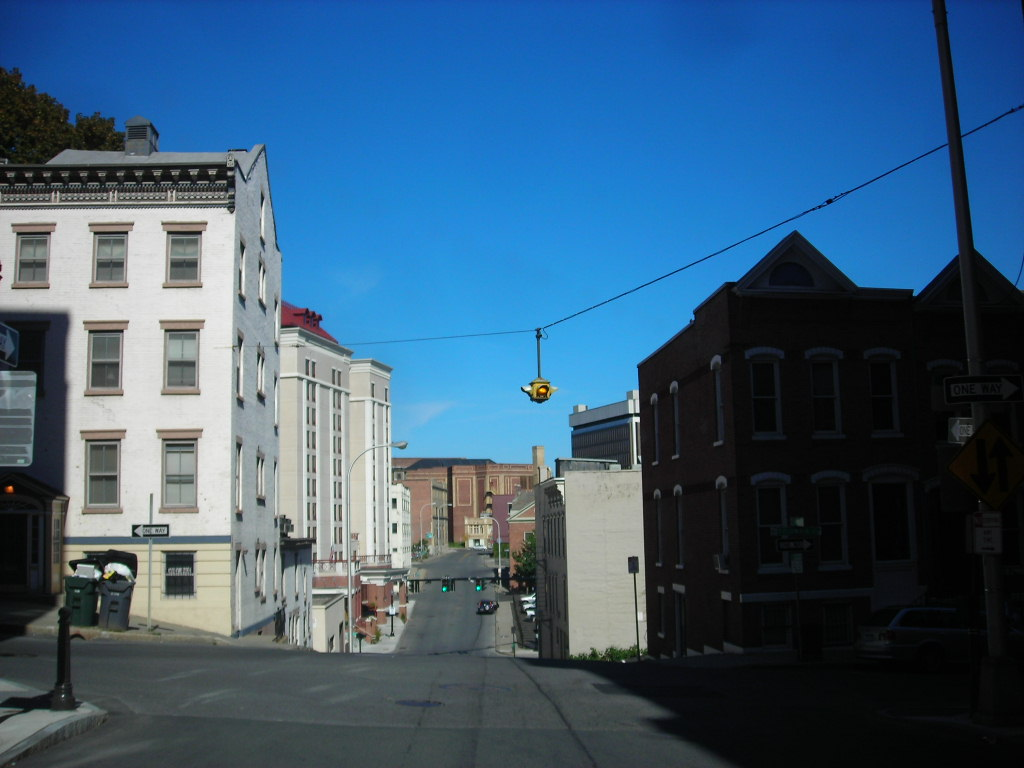
- Chapel Street at the eastern end of the hollow, looking north towards the Palace Theater
- Etymology: General Philip Sheridan, US Civil War
- Location of Sheridan Hollow within the state of New York
- Coordinates: 42°39′26″N 73°45′29″W
- Country: United States
- State: New York
- County: Albany County
- City: Albany

Population (2000)
  - Total: 791
- Time zone: UTC-5 (Eastern Standard Time)
  - Summer (DST): UTC-4 (Eastern Daylight Time)
- Area code: 518
- ZIP Code: 12207, 12210

Sheridan Hollow is a neighborhood in Albany, New York located in a ravine north of Downtown Albany. Capitol Hill to the south and Arbor Hill to the north flank the ravine. Often the neighborhood is overlooked by city residents, and outsiders who work in the neighborhood often don't recognize the name of the neighborhood. This is due to the identity of the Hollow being subsumed into its larger neighbor Arbor Hill, for instance news stories of events are often accredited to the wrong neighborhood. Being on undesirable land for development in colonial times, growth was slow in the Hollow and the neighborhood was populated through the centuries by a series of ethnic groups new to Albany, such as the Irish, Polish, and African Americans.

== History ==
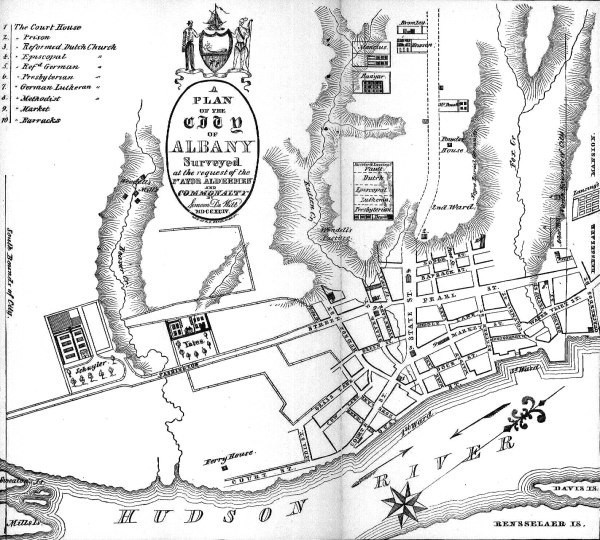
1790 map of Albany by Simeon De Witt, the Hollow with Foxes Creek is the ravine to the right

The Vossenkill or Vozenkill was the kill that formed the ravine; kill being Dutch for creek. The creek was named for Andries de Vos, an early settler, and in the late-1700s the name was anglicized to Foxes Creek or Foxenkill. The creek and associated ravine were passed over in the initial growth of settlement at Beverwyck and colonial Albany until the late 1700s.

The northern edge of the 1750 Albany stockade ran along the southern rim of the Sheridan Hollow ravine, along what is now Columbia Street. A 1758 British Army map shows a road extending through the ravine, and in 1762 the city's Common Council ordered a "Publick Street remain in the Foxes Creek" up to and "as farr as the Schytt Bergie", the Schytt Bergie (Dutch for "Dung Hill"), being a hill made of deposited horse dung between present-day Central and Western avenues. In 1763 the land north from Foxes Creek to the city line, which was the northern rim of the Hollow and future Clinton Avenue, was auctioned off primarily to tanners. This area was at the time called Woutenbergh, Dutch for woodland.

In 1764 a grid iron street plan by John Bleeker was established for the city outside the stockade. Clinton Avenue (Patroon Street at the time) being the northern border of the city this plan included Sheridan Hollow. The plan was not fully implemented until 1794 as adapted by Simeon De Witt. In the Bleeker plan the previous "Publick Street" was mostly turned into Howe Street, but as part of the removal of British names in 1790 Howe became Fox Street. Other streets in Sheridan Hollow whose names changed in 1790 were Wall Street became Hare (today Orange), Boscawen Street to Swan, Hawke Street to Hawk, Warren Street to Dove, Johnson Street to Lark, and Gage Street to Swallow (today Henry Johnson Boulevard).

During the US Revolutionary War Tories were supposedly hanged and buried here in Sheridan Hollow.

On a map made by De Witt in 1790 the name of Arbor Hill makes its first appearance on a map of Albany. In this map Arbor Hill is located in Sheridan Hollow between Orange Street and Clinton Avenue (south and north) and from Chapel Street halfway to Hawk Street (east to west); later Arbor Hill would be the name given to the Ten Broeck Mansion and surrounding neighborhood on the other side of Clinton Avenue, the former village of Colonie. On this same map a "Negro burial ground" is shown along the southern rim of the Hollow, this burial ground does not show up on any subsequent maps and it may never have been plotted and used.

Prior to 1797 Fox Street was a dirt road on the south side of Fox Creek, in 1797 the creek was channelized to flow behind the houses being built on the north side of the Fox Street which was renamed Canal Street. It was also in 1797 that the area west of Pearl Street were subdivided and sold, houses soon cropped up on Canal, Van Schaick (modern Monroe), and Orange streets. With the introduction of underground sewers beginning in 1854 the Fox Creek was turned into a 6-foot (1.8 m) diameter sewer under Canal Street.

In 1815 a city directory listed approximately 40 African American households, of which 11 were in Sheridan Hollow. Dinah Jackson, the first known African American property owner in Albany, owned several lots throughout Sheridan Hollow.

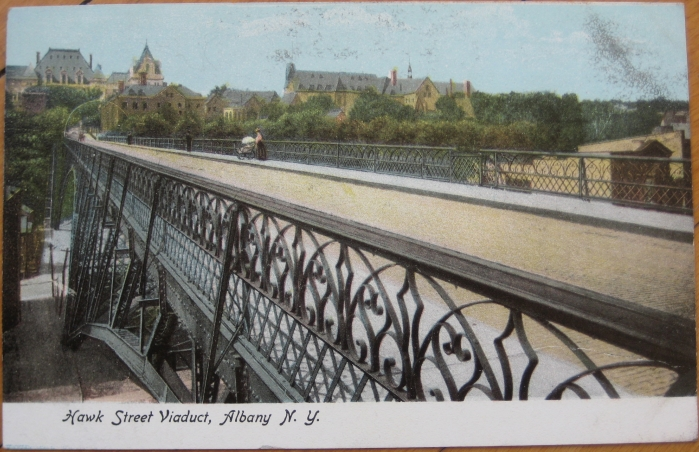
Hawk Street Viaduct in 1905; over Sheridan Hollow facing west towards State Capitol and Cathedral of All Saints.

In 1890 a viaduct was built carrying Hawk Street from Clinton Avenue to Elk Street, and in 1896 another was built to carry Northern Boulevard over most of Sheridan Hollow from Central Avenue to Sheridan Avenue. The Hawk Street Viaduct was the first ever cantilever arch bridge. In 1900 Canal Street was renamed Sheridan Avenue in honor of US Civil War General Philip Sheridan who was born at 83 Canal Street.

At the turn of the 19th century residents throughout Albany had high incidents of parasite infestation (such as roundworm and ringworm). Whereas the incidents of infection declined throughout the 1800s citywide, Sheridan Hollow's infection rates stayed high until the turn of the 20th century. Residents in Sheridan Hollow continued to use outhouses and wells that may have been contaminated well into the 1920s. During the 19th and early 20th centuries Sheridan Hollow was a predominantly immigrant neighborhood with a high rate of turnover as immigrant families moved up in social status to other neighborhoods and new immigrants moved in. Between 1917 and 1936 the turnover rate was 91%. The western section of the neighborhood bordering West Hill became dominated by Polish immigrants who built St. Casimir's Church in 1893, which closed in 2003.

In 1925 the Hawk Street Viaduct was rebuilt but by 1949 the bridge had once again fallen into disrepair and plans to refurbish the bridge fell through in 1958. In 1968 the bridge was closed to traffic and became pedestrian only, and demolished in 1970. The Northern Boulevard Viaduct was replaced in 1980. Today Northern Boulevard is Henry Johnson Boulevard.

In 1982 an oil burning steam generating plant in Sheridan Hollow was converted to burn garbage at the suggestion of Mayor Erastus Corning 2nd as part of the Albany New York Solid Waste Energy Recovery System (ANSWERS). Since Sheridan Hollow is a ravine and the smoke stacks are high enough to be at the level with the surrounding rim most of the pollution from the stacks ended up in neighboring Arbor Hill. Allen Hershkowitz, director of the Solid Waste and Energy Project for INFORM, a conservation research organization, said of the plant in 1986 that it "is the worst plant I've seen in the world." The garbage burning aspect of the plant was closed in 1994 by order of Governor Mario Cuomo.

Starting in the mid-1990s the eastern edge of Sheridan Hollow began to develop as part of a revival of Downtown Albany. A three-story bar and restaurant called The Big House Brewing Company on Sheridan Avenue and owned by Sheridan Hollow, Inc, was one of two "mega-bars" credited with bringing "after hours" life back to downtown. A Hampton Inn and Suites was built nearby on Chapel Street between Sheridan and Monroe in 2005, it hosts a local restaurant and bar, Yono's. Though the owners closed the Big House to concentrate on other projects and the Skyline restaurant and lounge failed to successfully replace it, the building is now being renovated into studio and one-bedroom apartments with first floor retail or restaurant space. Plans by the city are for more residential units at this end of the Hollow, in order to bring more people within walking distance of downtown. Part of this plan is to redevelop the former Boyd Printing Company building on Sheridan Avenue. Current plans are to keep the main four-story building as commercial and to build a new seven-story residential building between it and the Hampton Inn.

As part of the construction for a 1,380 car, 7-story parking garage by the state of New York along the southern rim of the Hollow, an archaeological study was performed to determine if the African American burial grounds shown on the 1790 De Witt plan were present. No traces of the cemetery were found in the 2-acre (0.81 ha) site of the garage. A memorial to the history of African Americans in Albany was built as part of the parking garage.

== Geography ==
Sheridan Hollow is, as its name suggests, a low-lying area (ravine) between two uplands, Capitol Hill to the south and Arbor Hill to the north. Clinton Avenue runs along the northern rim and Columbia and Elk streets run along the southern rim. The Hollow gently slopes up towards the west and at a sharper increase between Henry Johnson Boulevard and Lexington Avenue; the Hollow ends at the eastern edge of West Hill. Whereas most other ravines and creeks in Albany were filled in throughout the centuries, Sheridan Hollow was too deep, so growth in this part of the city remained stagnant and led to the isolation of Arbor Hill from Downtown.

== Demographics ==
As of the 2000 census, there were 791 people residing in Sheridan Hollow, as defined from North Pearl Street west to Henry Johnson Boulevard and from Columbia and Spruce streets north to Clinton Avenue. The neighborhood had 35% under the age of 14, 10% from 15 to 24, 33% from 25 to 44, 16% from 45 to 64, and 5% who were 65 years of age or older. 54% of the population is female. Of the population 25 and older, 28% of the population did not complete high school, 28% had only a high school diploma, 38% had some college experience or an associate degree, 6% had a bachelor's degree, and 2% a Master's or higher.

There were 324 households in 2000, out of which 40% had children under the age of 18 living with them, 20% were married couples living together, 30% had a female householder with no husband present, and less than 1% were non-families. 40% of all households were made up of individuals. 36% of all households had an income of less than $10,000; 30% had household income between $10,000 and $39,999; 33% between $40,000 and $59,999; and 1% over $60,000.

== Transportation ==
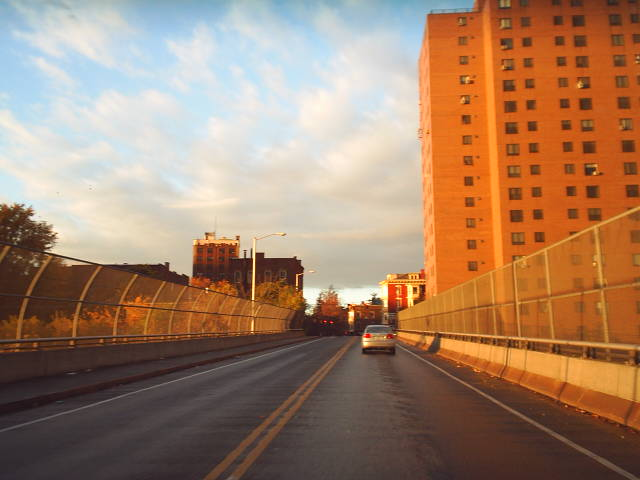
Henry Johnson Boulevard is carried over Sheridan Hollow on a viaduct.

Sheridan Hollow, being a ravine, can not be accessed easily from the north and south rims. From the south rim there are no roads that make the step decline into the ravine, several stairways allow for pedestrian access. Stairways connect Elk Street to Sheridan Avenue at Dove Street and at Swan Street. On the north rim, listed from east to west, Chapel, North Hawk, Swan, Dove, and Lark streets climb steeply up the ravine to Clinton Avenue. East of Chapel North Pearl Street is at the open end of the ravine and is relatively flat. Henry Johnson Boulevard at the western edge of the ravine crosses Sheridan Hollow on a viaduct. Orange Street and Sheridan Avenue are the only two east–west streets that span the length of the hollow. Lark Street is also a part of US Route 9W, the northern terminus of US 9W is at Clinton Avenue which is US Route 9.

== Notable residents ==
- Philip Sheridan – a career United States Army officer and Union general during the American Civil War.
- Henry Johnson – World War I hero and the first American recipient of France's highest military award, the Croix de Guerre.
