= Hawk Street Viaduct =

Bridge in Albany, New York, U.S.

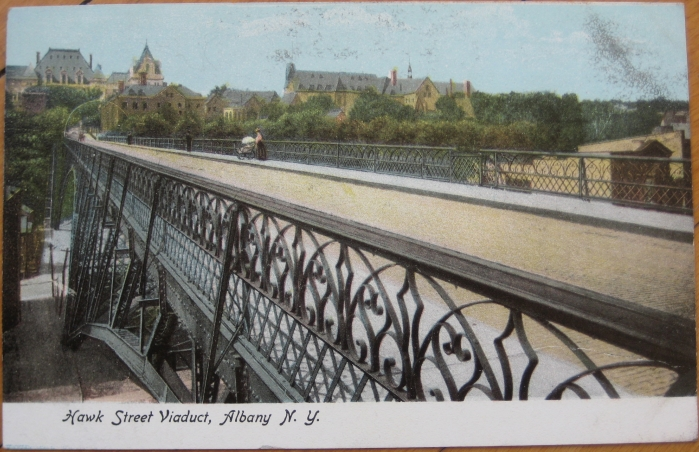
- Hawk Street Viaduct facing west towards New York State Capitol and Cathedral of All Saints
- Coordinates: 42°39′16″N 73°45′19″W
- Carries: Hawk Street
- Crosses: Sheridan Hollow
- Locale: Albany, New York
- Other name(s): Hawk Street Bridge

Characteristics
- Design: Cantilever arch

History
- Opened: 1890
- Closed: 1970

The Hawk Street Viaduct was a bridge spanning the Sheridan Hollow neighborhood in Albany, New York. It carried Hawk Street from Clinton Avenue to Elk Street. Completed in 1890, it was demolished in 1970 after decades of neglect which had caused it to be limited to pedestrian traffic only in 1968. It was the first cantilever arch bridge in the world.

== History ==
By the late 19th century, the social and physical need to build a bridge spanning Sheridan Hollow and connecting the wealthy neighborhoods around Capitol Hill with those of the more working-class neighborhoods along Clinton Avenue was apparent. A bill to authorize funds appeared numerous times before the State Legislature in the 1880s, but it was not until 1888 that the legislature finally approved the project. This was largely thanks to the efforts of Monroe Crannell, known as the "father of the bridge," who facilitated the "poor man's short cut to town." The City of Albany appropriated $125,000; however, only $107,000 of it was used, as construction costs only amounted to $90,000.

The bridge was designed by former New York State Engineer and Surveyor Elnathan Sweet and constructed in 1889-90 by the Hilton Bridge Construction Company, of which he was then president. Once it began, construction went rapidly. By mid-December 1889, both halves of the bridge were connected and paving of the western portion had begun. Work was complete by early spring 1890. Upon completion, a plaque bearing the inscription "Hawk St. Bridge" was installed at the apex joint of the central arch.

At its highest point the viaduct was 79 feet above street level. Owing to this height, the bridge was the scene of a number of suicides during its history, wherein people leaped from the railing to the pavement below.

Construction of the Hawk Street Viaduct was considered a "genuine architecture wonder", heralded the spread of the cantilever arch, and at 1,000 feet (300 m), was a great engineering experiment of the time. It was much admired and copied in Europe and America, in spite of being a dry-land structure that lacked the romance and boldness of bridges across water. In subsequent years, major cantilever arches were erected over the Seine and Viaur in France, over the Elbe Canal at Molln in Germany, and on railways in Alaska and Costa Rica.

By 1949, deterioration caused the maximum allowable carrying load to be reduced from ten to three tons. It was closed to pedestrian traffic in 1968 and dismantled in July 1970.

== Structure ==
The Hawk Street Viaduct was considered a cantilever arch due to each end of the arch structure having a cantilever arm that spanned the distance to the heights of the ravine rim to the north and south.

The principal element was the central three-hinged, two rib arch, spanning 360 feet. Springing north and south from each end of the arch was a 114 foot half-arch—a cantilever—that balanced much of the load on the central arch. Sixty-six-foot end spans extended beyond the cantilevers to the abutments.

The total length of the bridge with its approaches, from Clinton Avenue to Elk Street, was 1,000 feet. The hinges in the arch permitted its elements to adjust to changing temperature and traffic loads. They were composed of large iron pins, 12 inches in diameter. One pair of pins was located at the arch apex, while the other pairs were at the springing points where the arch rested on underground concrete piers.

Eight-hundred tons of iron and open hearth steel were used in the structure. It was originally paved with creosote coated yellow pine blocks. A highly decorative cast and wrought iron railing was also installed.
