= Ira Davenport Memorial Hospital =

New York (state) hospital system

- Arnot Ogden Medical Center

Geography
- Location: Bath, New York, United States
- Coordinates: 42°22′28″N 77°16′44″W

History
- Opened: 1910

Links
- Lists: Hospitals in New York State

Ira Davenport Memorial Hospital is a century-old medical facility in upstate New York that in 2011 became part of the Arnot Health System.

== History ==
Major funds for the hospital came from the closing of an orphanage that ran for 94 years which was founded by Ira Davenport. These funds enlarged and enhanced a 1910-founded hospital located in Bath, New York previously known as Bath Hospital. In 1990 a 120-bed nursing home named Fred & Harriett Taylor Health Center was opened adjacent to the hospital. The combined complex was renamed Davenport & Taylor Medical Center.

They're regarded as a rural hospital, and receive funding from the Federal Low Volume Hospital funding program, that enables such facilities to have an MRI machine in a region that would otherwise have none.
