= Frederick Cook (American politician) =

American politician

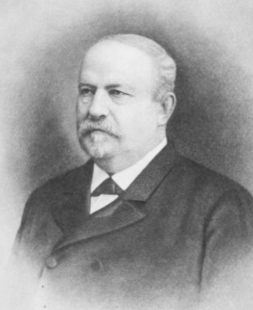

New York Secretary of State
- In office 1886–1889

Personal details
- Born: December 2, 1833; Bad Wildbad, Kingdom of Württemberg
- Died: February 17, 1905 (aged 71); Rochester, New York
- Resting place: Mount Hope Cemetery
- Political party: Democratic
- Spouses: Catharine Yaky (m. 1863; died 1864) Barbara Agne (m. 1865)
- Children: 1
- Occupation: Businessman, politician
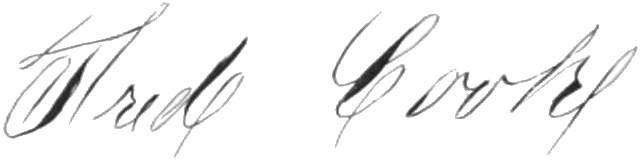
- Signature

Frederick Cook (December 2, 1833 – February 17, 1905) was an American businessman and politician. He served as the New York Secretary of State from 1886 to 1889.

== Early life ==
Frederick Cook was born in Bad Wildbad, Kingdom of Württemberg on December 2, 1833. He came to the United States in 1848, and changed his German name Friedrich Kuch to Frederick Cook. He first lived in Buffalo, New York, and worked for his brother-in-law who was a shoemaker. Then he opened his own butcher shop at Batavia, New York. After that he became a brakeman on the Buffalo and Rochester Railroad, and later a conductor on the New York Central Railroad a position he held for twenty years during which he became wealthy. (There is a story about this: Asked by Cornelius Vanderbilt how he could buy vast pieces of real estate and live expensively on $75 a week, Cook is said to have answered "Oh, I makes (sic) my money trading horses with Jockey Mason," which became something of a proverb at the time.)

== Political career ==
In 1872, he left the railroad, and entered politics. Governor John Thompson Hoffman appointed him Judge Advocate of the 7th Division of the National Guard. In 1874, he ran for Mayor of Rochester, New York but was defeated by George G. Clarkson while otherwise the whole Democratic ticket was elected. In 1875, Governor Samuel J. Tilden appointed him Assistant Adjutant General and Chief of Staff of the 7th Division of the National Guard. He was a delegate to the 1876 Democratic National Convention. He was Secretary of State of New York from 1886 to 1889, elected in 1885 and 1887.

== Business ==
In 1892, he sued the Silver Lake Ice Company, and tried to establish his claim to be the owner of the Silver Lake in Wyoming County, New York.

He was the President of the Rochester German Insurance Company, the German-American Bank of Rochester, the Rochester Driving Park Association, the Rochester Telephone Company, the Rochester Street Car Company, Vice President of the Bartholomay Brewing Company, and had interests in many other companies.

== Personal life ==
He married Catharine Yaky in 1863. She died in 1864, and he remarried to Barbara Agne in 1865. They had one daughter.

He died of apoplexy at his home in Rochester on February 17, 1905. He was buried at Mount Hope Cemetery.

== Sources ==
- His "record", in NYT on September 26, 1885
- The Political Graveyard: Index to Politicians: Cook, E to F at politicalgraveyard.com Political Graveyard
- His lawsuit, in NYT on November 30, 1892
- Obit, in NYT on February 18, 1905

Political offices
Preceded by Joseph Bradford Carr	New York Secretary of State; 1886–1889	Succeeded by Frank Rice
