= Silas Seymour =

American politician

Silas Seymour (June 20, 1817 – July 15, 1890) was an American civil engineer and politician from New York.

== Life ==
Silas Seymour
- Born: June 20, 1817; Stillwater, Saratoga County, New York
- Died: July 15, 1890 (aged 73); New York City
- Resting place: Mount Hermon Cemetery, Sillery, Quebec, Canada
- Title: New York State Engineer and Surveyor
- Term: 1856-1857, 1882–1883

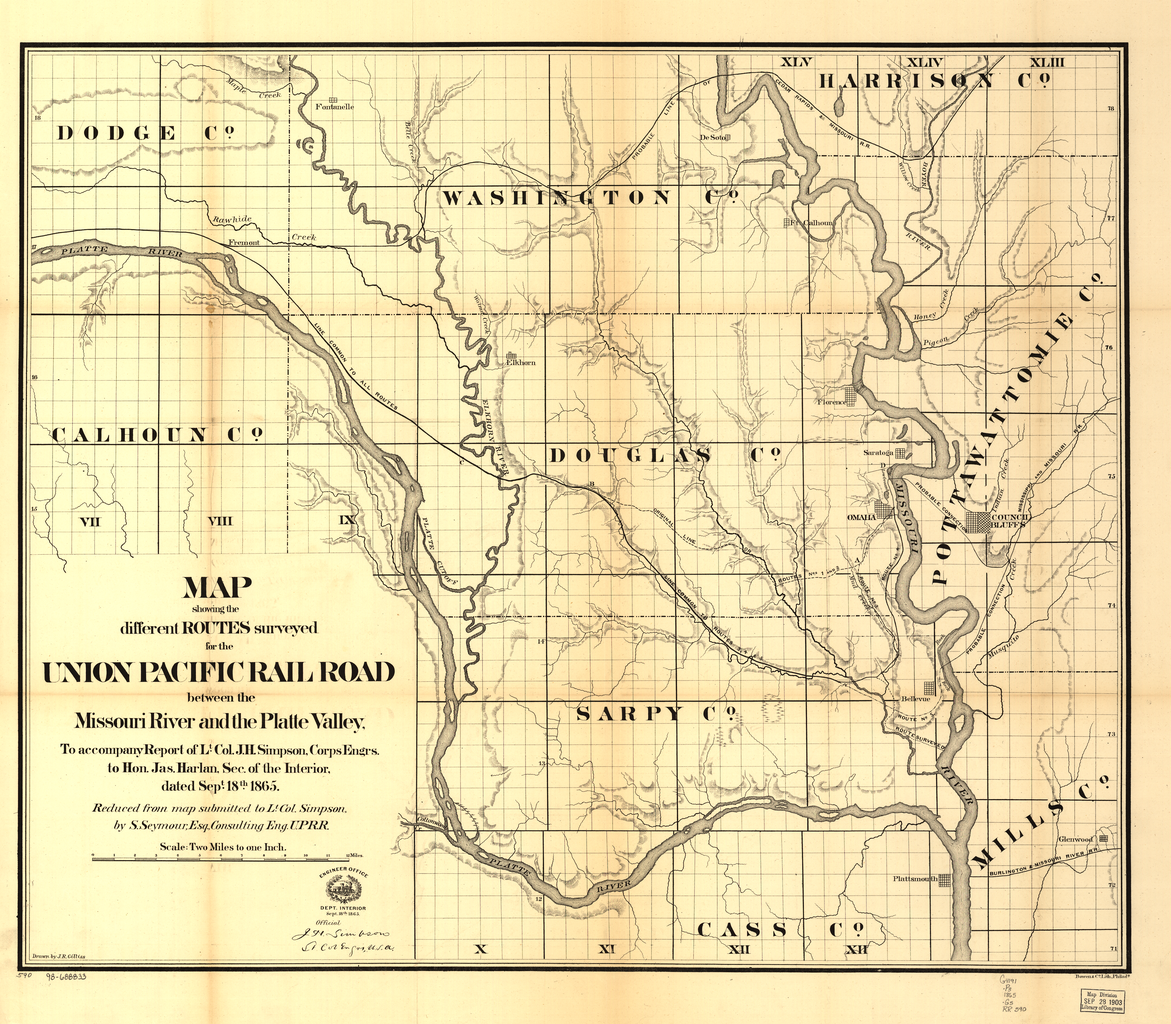
"Map Showing the Different Routes Surveyed for the Union Pacific Rail Road Between the Missouri River and the Platte Valley" by Silas Seymour, around 1865.

Silas was the son of John Seymour (1792-1876) and Sarah (Montgomery) Seymour (1793-1824). He was born and educated in Stillwater, NY following which his family moved to Fredonia. In the spring of 1835 he began work as an axman on one of the engineering parties engaged in making the first surveys for the New York and Erie Railroad, soon after was promoted to rodman, and by the end of the year had become an assistant engineer. He spent one year at the Fredonia Academy when in 1837, construction stopped on the NY & Erie RR due to lack of funds. In 1838, he was made Division Engineer, and later became Chief Engineer of the Dunkirk and State Line Railroad. On December 23, 1840, he married Delia S. French of Dunkirk (1821-1884) and they had six children: Florence (Mrs. Theodore W. Bayaud), George French, Hanson Risley (died as an infant), James Montgomery ("Mont"), Jeanie (Mrs. Jean G. P. Blanchet), and Silas Jr.

About 1851 he became Chief Engineer and was for some time General Superintendent of the Buffalo and New York City Railroad, extending from Hornellsville to Buffalo, New York, and he designed and constructed the bridge across the Genesee River at Portage, New York. Late in 1851 H C Seymour & Co was formed in Albany with four principals: Hezekiah C Seymour, Silas, Alvin Morton and Calvin Mather. In 1853, H.C. Seymour and Mather died, leaving Morton, Seymour & Co. to handle the Louisville and Nashville project, which had been secured under Hezekiah's leadership. When the Sacramento Valley project began a few years later, the name had changed to Robinson, Seymour & Co. of NY with the addition of Lester L Robinson. Silas appears to have recommended Theodore Judah as chief engineer for the Sacramento Valley project but was not heavily involved himself. At the time of the Sacramento Valley contract, Robinson, Seymour & Co was said to be the largest railroad contracting firm in the US.

He was New York State Engineer and Surveyor from 1856 to 1857, elected on the American Party ticket. In March 1856, he repudiated the nomination of former President Millard Fillmore as the American Party's candidate for the presidency.

In 1858 he established himself as a Consulting Engineer in New York City. He was appointed Chief Engineer of the Washington and Alexandria Railroad, and constructed a bridge across the Potomac.

In 1860, he supported Stephen A. Douglas for President, and expressed in a letter to Col. John W. Forney his opinion, that slavery should continue in the South, and that the South and the North should compromise or have separate governments.

In 1863, he became Consulting Engineer, and later Chief Engineer, of the Washington Aqueduct. In the winter of 1863-1864, he was Consulting Engineer of the Union Pacific Railroad. He designed the high bridge over Dale Creek Cañon, near the summit of the Black Hills of the Rocky Mountains.

From 1868 to 1871, he was Consulting Engineer of the Adirondack Railroad in New York and was reappointed in 1882. From 1871 to 1878 he was Consulting and Acting Chief Engineer of the North Shore Railway in Canada. The North Shore railway was the part of the Quebec, Montreal, Ottawa and Occidental RR that ran through Quebec. On his return to the U.S. in 1878, he was successively President of the Massachusetts Central Railroad and Consulting Engineer of the West Shore Railroad.

He was New York State Engineer and Surveyor again from 1882 to 1883, elected in 1881 on the Republican ticket, but defeated for re-election in 1883 by Democrat Elnathan Sweet.

He retired to Dansville, NY and died at the residence of his son, Silas Seymour Jr. (b. 1860), at 458 West 22nd Street in New York City. At the time of his death, he was Consulting Engineer of the Cape Cod Ship Canal and interested in railroads in Florida. He is buried at Mount Hermon Cemetery in Sillery, Quebec, Canada.

Political offices
Preceded by John T. Clark	New York State Engineer and Surveyor; 1856 – 1857	Succeeded by Van Rensselaer Richmond
Preceded by Horatio Seymour, Jr.	New York State Engineer and Surveyor; 1882 – 1883	Succeeded by Elnathan Sweet
