= 1903 New York state election =

The 1903 New York state election was held on November 3, 1903, to elect a judge of the New York Court of Appeals, as well as all members of the New York State Assembly and one member of the New York State Senate.

== Background ==
Denis O'Brien had been elected to the Court of Appeals in 1889, and his term would expire at the end of 1903.

State Senator Charles P. McClelland was appointed U.S. General Appraiser by President Theodore Roosevelt and thus vacated his seat.

== Candidates ==
The Democratic State Committee met on September 5 in Albany, New York. Frank Campbell was chairman. The incumbent judge Denis O'Brien was re-nominated unanimously.

The Republican State Committee met on September 8 at the Fifth Avenue Hotel. George W. Dunn was chairman. They endorsed the Democratic incumbent Denis O'Brien.

== Result ==
The jointly nominated incumbent Denis O'Brien was re-elected.

96 Republicans, 53 Democrats and 1 Independent were elected for the session of 1904 to the Assembly.

Republican Francis M. Carpenter was elected to succeed Democrat McClelland in the State Senate, giving the Republicans a majority of 29 to 21 in 1904.

1903 state election result
Office	Democratic ticket		Republican ticket	Social Democratic ticket		Prohibition ticket		Socialist Labor ticket	
Judge of the Court of Appeals	Denis O'Brien	1,307,998	Denis O'Brien	Charles H. Matchett	33,399	Charles E. Manierre	19,347	Daniel De Leon	10,677

== See also ==
- New York state elections

== Sources ==
- Result in New York County: OFFICIAL ELECTION TOTALS in NYT on December 2, 1903
- COUNT ON LEGISLATURE in NYT on November 5, 1903
- Result: The Tribune Almanac 1904
