= 1885 New York state election =

1885 New York gubernatorial election
- November 3, 1885
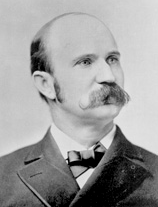

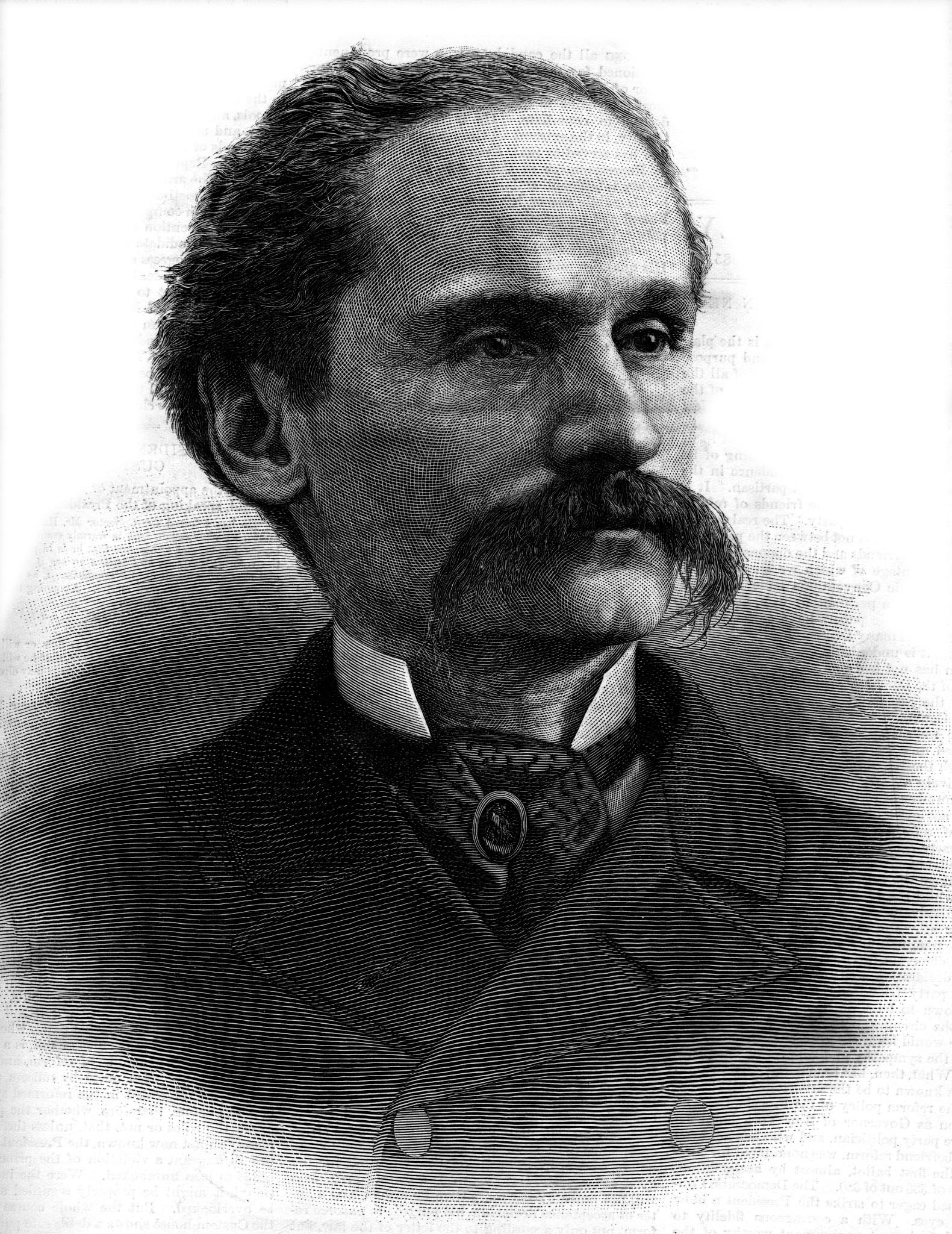
Nominee	David B. Hill	Ira Davenport
Party	Democratic	Republican
Popular vote	501,465	490,331
Percentage	48.93%	47.85%
- County results Hill: 40–50% 50–60% 60–70% Davenport: 40–50% 50–60% 60–70%
Governor before election
David B. Hill
Democratic
Elected Governor
David B. Hill
Democratic

The 1885 New York state election was held on November 3, 1885, to elect the governor, the lieutenant governor, the secretary state, the state comptroller, the attorney general, the state treasurer and the state engineer, as well as all members of the New York State Assembly and the New York State Senate.

== History ==
The Prohibition state convention met on September 9 at Syracuse, New York. William J. Groo presided. Henry Clay Bascom, of Troy, was nominated for governor by acclamation. W Jennings Demorest, of New York City, for lieutenant governor, Edward Evans, of Tonawanda, for Secretary of State, Hiram Vandenburgh, of Fulton County, for treasurer, Frederick Sheldon, of Hornellsville, for attorney general, and George A. Dudley for state engineer, were nominated unanimously.

The Greenback State Committee met on September 9 at Clarendon Hall in New York City. Ralph Beaumont was chosen to preside over the convention. The Anti-Monopoly delegates met in an adjoining room, Dr. Seeger presided. The remnants of Benjamin F. Butler's "People's Party" merged with the Anti-Monopolists. When the Greenback/Anti-Monopoly convention opened there was much debate among the several factions, and the Anti-Monopolists walked out. The remaining Greenbackers were split in two opposing factions: the friends and the adversaries of Edward O. Jones, the latter faction led by Louis F. Post, a New York City banker. Post's faction then walked out too, and the remaining delegates nominated George O. Jones, of Albany, for governor; Lyman W. Gage, of Rochester, for lieutenant governor; George W. Pimm, of Coldenham, for Secretary of State; Nelson S. Shaler, of Catskill, for comptroller; Allen Wood for treasurer; William B. Guernsey, of Norwich, for attorney general; and Edwin A. Stillman for state engineer.

The Republican state convention met on September 23 at the Skating Rink in Saratoga Springs, New York. James W. Husted was president. Ex-Comptroller Ira Davenport (in office 1880–1881) was nominated for governor after the second ballot. Many candidates were proposed and on the first ballot the votes were scattered among many names, the second ballot stood as follows: Davenport 214, Joseph B. Carr 194, James D. Warren 113, C. N. Bliss 66, Frederick W. Seward 54, Swinburne 29, Drexel 12, Levi P. Morton 8, Alonzo B. Cornell 2, William M. Evarts 1. Then many delegates changed their votes and Davenport was nominated. Secretary of State Joseph B. Carr (in office since 1880) was nominated for lieutenant governor; Deputy Secretary of State Anson S. Wood was nominated to succeed Carr; and Ex-Comptroller James W. Wadsworth (in office 1880–1881) was nominated again, all three by acclamation. For Treasurer, a first ballot was taken and the votes were scattered among many different names (vote: D. Ogden Bradley 173, William T. O'Neil 157, Waldo Wallace Rockwell 149, Nathan D. Wendell 88, Robert N. Marvin 76, Stephen C. Medbury 49). Then it was proposed to give the nomination to a German-American, and Charles F. Ulrich was nominated unanimously. Edward B. Thomas was nominated for attorney general on the second ballot (first ballot: Thomas 318, E. H. Hobbs 257, Edward Mitchell 93, Sheldon 8; second ballot: Thomas 353, Hobbs 321, Mitchell 5). William V. Van Rensselaer was nominated for state engineer by acclamation.

The Democratic state convention met on September 24. George Raines was president. The incumbent Governor David B. Hill was re-nominated on the first ballot (vote: Hill 338, Abram S. Hewitt 33, Henry W. Slocum 8, Roswell P. Flower 1). Contrary to tradition, the nomination was not "made unanimous."

== Results ==
The whole Democratic ticket was elected.

The incumbents Hill, Chapin, O'Brien and Sweet were re-elected.

1885 state election results
Office	Democratic ticket		Republican ticket		Prohibition ticket		Greenback ticket	
Governor	David B. Hill	501,465	Ira Davenport	490,331	Henry Clay Bascom	30,867	George O. Jones	2,130
Lieutenant Governor	Edward F. Jones	495,464	Joseph B. Carr	492,308	W. Jennings Demorest	30,531	Lyman W. Gage	2,147
Secretary of State	Frederick Cook	503,266	Anson S. Wood	488,658	Edward Evans	30,865	George W. Pimm	1,986
Comptroller	Alfred C. Chapin	502,237	James W. Wadsworth	489,992	Frederick Sheldon	30,861	Nelson W. Shaler	2,248
Attorney General	Denis O'Brien	502,214	Edward B. Thomas	488,511	W. Martin Jones	29,985	William B. Guernsey	2,178
Treasurer	Lawrence J. Fitzgerald	500,908	Charles F. Ulrich	489,369	Hiram Vandenburgh	25,450	Allen C. Wood	2,208
State Engineer	Elnathan Sweet	502,205	William V. Van Rensselaer	489,956	George A. Dudley	30,840	Edwin A. Stillman	1,903

21 Republicans and 11 Democrats were elected to a two-year term (1886–1887) in the State Senate; and 77 Republicans and 51 Democrats were elected to the State Assembly.

== See also ==
- New York gubernatorial elections

== Sources ==
- Result for Suffolk, Ulster and Herkimer Counties: CANVASSING THE RETURNS in NYT on November 14, 1885
- Result in New York City: THE CITY'S VOTE DECLARED in NYT on November 21, 1885
- Results: The Tribune Almanac 1886
