= Hamilton Ward Jr. =

American lawyer and politician

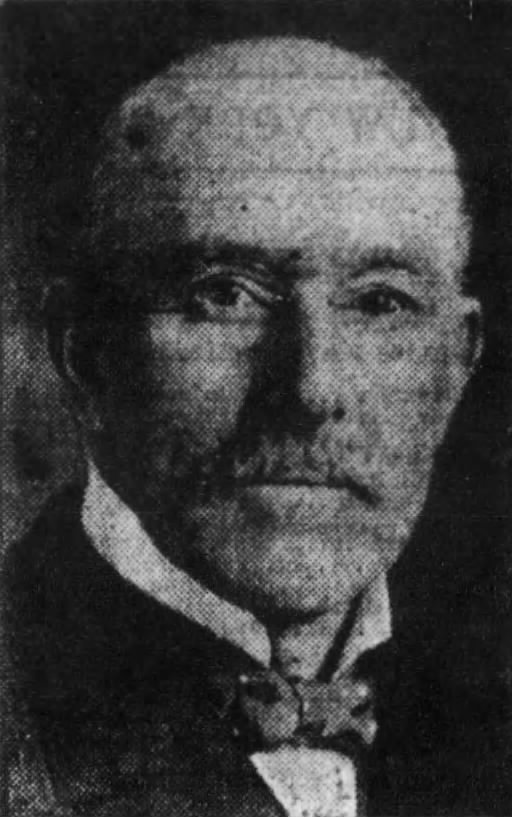
- Ward c. 1930

New York State Attorney General
- In office January 1, 1929 – December 31, 1930
- Governor: Franklin D. Roosevelt
- Preceded by: Albert Ottinger
- Succeeded by: John J. Bennett Jr.

Personal details
- Born: 20 January 1871; Washington, D.C., U.S.
- Died: 8 October 1932 (aged 61); Buffalo, New York, U.S.
- Cause of death: Pneumonia
- Resting place: Belmont, New York
- Parent: Hamilton Ward Sr. (father)
- Occupation: Lawyer; politician

Military service
- Branch/service: United States Army
- Rank: Captain
- Battles/wars: Spanish–American War

Hamilton Ward Jr. (January 20, 1871 — October 8, 1932) was an American lawyer and politician.

== Biography ==
Hamilton Ward Jr. was born in Washington, DC on January 20, 1871, while his father Hamilton Ward Sr. was serving in Congress. The younger Ward was educated at Saint Paul's Hall in Salem, New York and the Vermont Episcopal Institute in Burlington. He studied law with his father and his father's partner, Elba Reynolds. Ward was admitted to the bar in 1892 and practiced in Philipsville, now Belmont, New York. He later relocated to Buffalo, New York, where he was Erie County's collateral inheritance clerk and an assistant district attorney.

He fought in the Spanish–American War in Cuba as a captain. In 1907, he was Commander-in-Chief of the United Spanish War Veterans. As a Republican, he was New York State Attorney General from 1929 to 1930, elected in 1928.

Ward was a prominent Buffalonian and an ardent conservationist who was instrumental in the establishment and design of Chesnut Ridge Park in the 1920s. A memorial to Ward exists in the southern part of the park. He also founded Allegany State Park, as well as the Erie County Parks Commission, which was vital in forming the first four county parks of Chesnut Ridge, Ellicott Creek, Como Lake, and Emery. Upon his death, he bequeathed several hundred acres of his property to the county that became part of Chesnut Ridge Park.

He died from pneumonia in Buffalo, New York, and was buried at the Forest Hill Cemetery in Belmont, New York. His brother was Episcopal Bishop John C. Ward.

== Sources ==
- Commanders-in-Chief of USWV, with photo at ancestry.com
- Complete List of NYS Attorneys General at www.oag.state.ny.us (Office of the NYSAG)
- The Political Graveyard: Index to Politicians: Ward, G to I at politicalgraveyard.com
- His father's obituary, New York Times, December 29, 1898

Party political offices
Preceded by Albert Ottinger	Republican nominee for Attorney General of New York; 1928	Succeeded by Isadore Bookstein
Legal offices
Preceded by Albert Ottinger	New York State Attorney General; 1929–1930	Succeeded by John J. Bennett Jr.
