= 1933 New York state election =

- November 7, 1933

The 1933 New York state election was held on November 7, 1933, to elect a judge of the New York Court of Appeals, as well as all members of the New York State Assembly. Besides the elections, four amendments to the State Constitution were proposed.

== History ==
In 1933, there was only one state officer to be elected statewide: a judge of the Court of Appeals, to succeed Cuthbert W. Pound, who had been elected Chief Judge in 1932. Leonard C. Crouch had been appointed in March 1932 to the seat when Pound was appointed temporarily Chief Judge. Crouch was re-appointed in January 1933 after Pound's taking office for his elected term.

The Republican State Convention met on September 14 at the National Republican Club in New York City, W. Kingsland Macy presided. They endorsed the Democratic nominee Leonard C. Crouch.

The Democratic State Committee met on October 2 at Albany, New York, U.S. Postmaster General James A. Farley presided. The incumbent Leonard C. Crouch was nominated to succeed himself.

== Result ==
The jointly nominated incumbent Crouch was re-elected.

1933 state election result
Office	Democratic ticket		Republican ticket	Socialist ticket		Law Preservation ticket	Communist ticket		City Fusion ticket
Judge of the Court of Appeals	Leonard C. Crouch	3,249,936	Leonard C. Crouch	Darwin J. Meserole	100,413	Leonard C. Crouch	Dominick Fliani	30,869	Leonard C. Crouch

Obs.: "Blank, void and scattering" votes: 1,094,952

== See also ==
- New York state elections
