= Hamilton Ward Sr. =

American politician

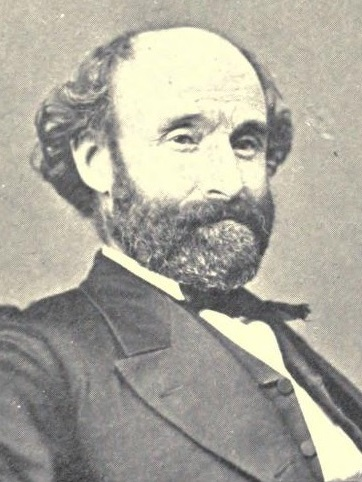

Justice of the New York Supreme Court, Appellate Division
- In office 1895–1898

Justice of the New York Supreme Court
- In office 1891–1895

Attorney General of New York
- In office 1880–1881

Member of the U.S. House of Representatives from New York's 27th district
- In office March 4, 1865 – March 3, 1871
- Preceded by: Robert B. Van Valkenburgh
- Succeeded by: Horace B. Smith

Allegany County District Attorney
- In office 1862–1865
- In office 1856–1859

Personal details
- Born: July 3, 1829 Salisbury, Herkimer County, New York
- Died: December 28, 1898 (aged 69) Wellsville, Allegany County, New York
- Relatives: Hamilton Ward Jr. (son)

Hamilton Ward Sr. (July 3, 1829– December 28, 1898) was an American lawyer and politician who served as a judge on the Supreme Court of New York, the attorney general of New York, and a Republican member of the United States House of Representatives.

== Education ==
He attended the common schools and was privately tutored. He studied law in Elmira, New York, was admitted to the bar.

== Early career ==
He commenced legal practice in Philipsville in 1851.

Beginning in 1858 Ward was regularly selected as a delegate to New York's Republican state conventions, and he attended almost every one until 1890.

He was district attorney of Allegany County from 1856 to 1859 and again from 1862 to 1865. He was appointed in 1862 by the governor of New York as commissioner to raise and equip troops for the Civil War.

== United States House of Representatives ==
Ward was elected as a Republican to the 39th, 40th and 41st United States Congresses, serving from March 4, 1865 to March 3, 1871. While a Representative, he was Chairman of the Committee on Revolutionary Claims (Fortieth Congress).

In 1868, Ward was on the seven-person committee tasked with authoring the articles of impeachment against President Andrew Johnson after Johnson was impeached.

Ward was not a candidate for renomination to the House in 1870.

== Post-congressional career in New York State politics ==
Ward was attorney general of New York from 1880 to 1881, elected in 1879.

Ward was a delegate to the New York State Constitutional Convention of 1890, and was appointed (and subsequently elected) a justice of the New York Supreme Court and served from 1891 to 1895, and in the Appellate Division from 1895 until his death in 1898.

== Personal life ==
Ward's son Hamilton Ward Jr. would go on to serve as attorney general of New York himself (1929–1930).

Ward was buried at the Forest Hill Cemetery in Belmont.

== Sources ==
- United States Congress. "Hamilton Ward Sr. (id: W000133)". Biographical Directory of the United States Congress.
- Obituary in the New York Times on December 29, 1898

U.S. House of Representatives
Preceded by Robert B. Van Valkenburgh	Member of the U.S. House of Representatives from New York's 27th congressional district 1865–1871	Succeeded by Horace B. Smith
Legal offices
Preceded by Augustus Schoonmaker Jr.	New York Attorney General; 1880–1881	Succeeded by Leslie W. Russell
