= Leslie W. Russell =

American politician (1840–1903)

Leslie Wead Russell
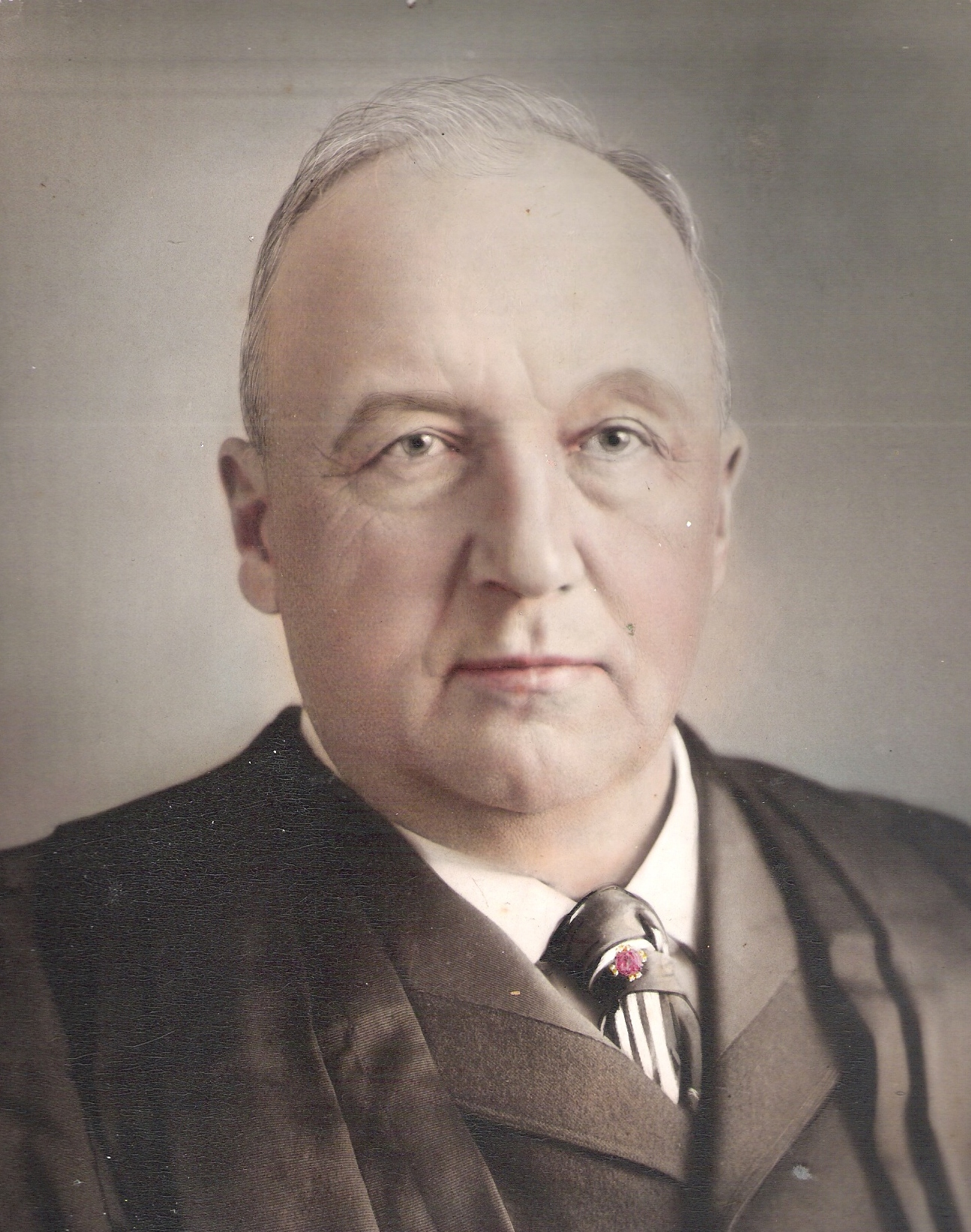
- Judge Leslie W. Russell

New York Supreme Court 4th Judicial District
- In office 1891–1902
- Succeeded by: John M. Kellogg

New York's 22nd congressional district, United States House of Representatives
- In office March 4, 1891 – September 11, 1891
- Preceded by: Frederick Lansing
- Succeeded by: Newton Martin Curtis

New York State Attorney General
- In office January 1, 1882 – December 31, 1883
- Governor: Alonzo B. Cornell; Grover Cleveland
- Preceded by: Hamilton Ward, Sr.
- Succeeded by: Denis O'Brien

Personal details
- Born: April 15, 1840 Canton, New York
- Died: February 3, 1903 (aged 62) Flushing, Queens, New York
- Party: Republican
- Relatives: Rev. Samuel Russell (1660–1731) (great-great-great-grandfather)
- Occupation: Lawyer

Leslie Wead Russell (April 15, 1840 – February 3, 1903) was an American lawyer and politician.

== Life ==
Russell was the son of Assemblyman John Leslie Russell (1805–1861) and Mary Sybil (Wead) Russell (ca. 1812–1870). He was educated at Canton Academy, and at age 16 began to teach school. Then he studied law at Albany, New York and Milwaukee, Wisconsin. He was admitted to the bar in 1861, and commenced practice in Canton, NY. On October 19, 1864, he married Harriet Jane Lawrence (1843–1931), and they had six children two of whom died in infancy.

Russell was a delegate to the New York State Constitutional Convention of 1867. In 1869, he was elected District Attorney of St. Lawrence County, and County Judge in 1877. He was New York Attorney General from 1882 to 1883, elected at the New York state election, 1881. Afterwards he resumed the practice of law at New York City.

Russell was a delegate to the 1884 and 1900 Republican National Conventions. He was a member of the 52nd United States Congress and served until September 11, 1891, when he resigned to become a justice of the New York State Supreme Court. He resigned from the bench on October 1, 1902.

Russell was buried at the Evergreen Cemetery in Canton, N.Y.

State Senator Charles H. Russell (1845–1912) was his first cousin. Rev. Samuel Russell (1660–1731) was his great-great-great-grandfather.

== Sources ==
- United States Congress. "Leslie W. Russell (id: R000535)". Biographical Directory of the United States Congress.
- TO RUN FOR CONGRESS in NYT on July 30, 1890
- RUSSELL'S CHANCES IMPROVED in NYT on August 16, 1890
- LESLIE W. RUSSELL NOMINATED in NYT on August 14, 1891
- AFTER RUSSELL'S PLACE.; NEW COMPLICATIONS IN THE TWENTY-SECOND DISTRICT. in NYT on August 15, 1891
- Leslie W. Russell, Justice of the Supreme Court, Fourth Judicial District in NYT on May 16, 1897
- JUSTICE RUSSELL RESIGNS in NYT on October 3, 1902
- EX-JUSTICE RUSSELL DEAD in NYT on February 4, 1903
- Bio and genealogy transcribed from Genealogical and Family History of Northern New York by William Richard Cutter, at New York Roots
- MEMORIAL OF LESLIE W. RUSSELL Annual Reports and Charter, Constitution, By-laws, Names of Officers, Committees, Members, Etc., Etc., (Association of the Bar of the City of New York, 1905), pp 148–150.

Legal offices
Preceded by Hamilton Ward, Sr.	New York State Attorney General; 1882–1883	Succeeded by Denis O'Brien
U.S. House of Representatives
Preceded by Frederick Lansing	Member of the U.S. House of Representatives from New York's 22nd congressional district 1891	Succeeded by Newton Martin Curtis
