= 1928 New York state election =

1928 New York gubernatorial election
- November 6, 1928

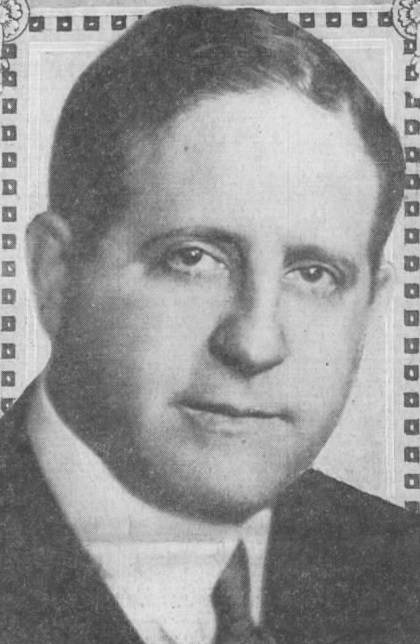
Nominee	Franklin D. Roosevelt	Albert Ottinger
Party	Democratic	Republican
Popular vote	2,130,193	2,104,129
Percentage	48.96%	48.34%
- County results Roosevelt: 50–60% 60–70% Ottinger: 50–60% 60–70% 70–80%
Governor before election
Al Smith
Democratic
Elected Governor
Franklin Delano Roosevelt
Democratic

The 1928 New York state elections were held on November 6, 1928, to elect the governor, the lieutenant governor, the state comptroller, the attorney general, a U.S. senator and a judge of the New York Court of Appeals, as well as all members of the New York State Assembly and the New York State Senate. Incumbent Governor Al Smith did not seek reelection, and instead unsuccessfully ran for President.

== Conventions ==
=== Workers Convention ===
The Workers state convention met on June 10.

=== Socialist Convention ===
The Socialist state convention met on July 15 at Albany, New York.

=== Republican Convention ===
The Republican state convention met on September 29 at Syracuse, New York.

=== Democratic Convention ===
The Democratic state convention met on October 2 at Rochester, New York.

William Stormont Hackett, the mayor of Albany, had indicated to friends in late 1925 and early 1926 that he intended to enter the campaign for governor in 1928, presuming that Governor Al Smith won reelection in 1926 and made the presidential race in 1928. As a result of Hackett's death in early 1926, the Democratic Party in New York next turned to Edwin Corning as their likely nominee for governor in 1928. Corning was a leader of Daniel P. O'Connell's Democratic organization in Albany, and had been elected Lieutenant Governor in 1926. However, Corning began to suffer health problems, and declined to become a candidate. As a result of Hackett's death and Corning's poor health, in 1928 New York Democrats attempted to recruit several other prominent politicians to run, including Robert F. Wagner, George R. Lunn, and Peter G. Ten Eyck. After those efforts failed, the party turned to Franklin D. Roosevelt to make the 1928 governor's race. He was nominated by acclamation at the state party convention.

== Result ==
Four Democrats and two Republicans were elected in a tight race, resulting in no party change overall. The incumbents Tremaine and Copeland were re-elected.

The Democratic, Republican, and Socialist parties maintained automatic ballot access, the Socialist Labor Party did not re-attain it, and the Workers Party did not attain it.

1928 state election results
Office	Democratic ticket		Republican ticket		Socialist ticket		Workers ticket		Socialist Labor ticket	
Governor	Franklin D. Roosevelt	2,130,193	Albert Ottinger	2,104,129	Louis Waldman	101,859	William F. Dunne	10,741	Charles H. Corregan	4,213
Lieutenant Governor	Herbert H. Lehman	2,078,921	Charles C. Lockwood	2,064,882	Herman J. Hahn	105,806	Franklin P. Brill	11,715	John E. DeLee	5,198
Comptroller	Morris S. Tremaine	2,053,971	Harry B. Crowley	2,038,306	Elizabeth C. Roth	117,346	Lovett Fort-Whiteman	12,370	Henrietta Silver	6,733
Attorney General	Albert Conway	2,014,769	Hamilton Ward Jr.	2,081,279	William Karlin	118,797	Juliet S. Poyntz	12,464	Simeon Bickwheat	5,701
Judge of the Court of Appeals	Leonard C. Crouch	2,006,239	Irving G. Hubbs	2,067,046	Hezekiah D. Wilcox	120,076				
U.S. Senator	Royal S. Copeland	2,084,273	Alanson B. Houghton	2,034,014	McAlister Coleman	111,208	Robert Minor	11,956	Henry Kuhn	5,543

== See also ==
- New York gubernatorial elections
- New York state elections
- 1928 United States presidential election

== Notes ==
- Vote Totals-New York Red Book 1929
