= Albert Ottinger =

American politician

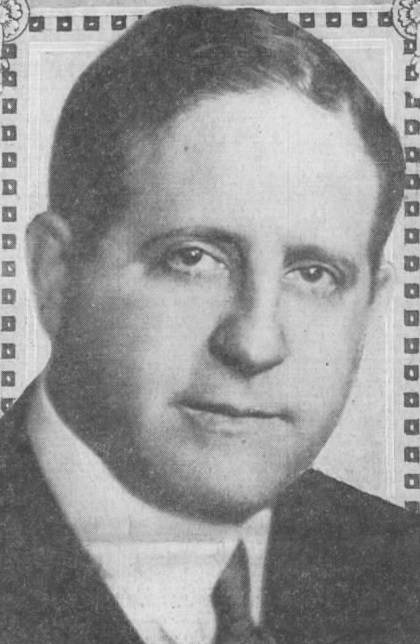
- Ottinger from the September 29, 1928, Binghamton Press

Attorney General of New York
- In office January 1, 1925 – December 31, 1928
- Governor: Al Smith
- Preceded by: Carl Sherman
- Succeeded by: Hamilton Ward, Jr.

United States Assistant Attorney General
- In office January 1921 – December 31, 1924
- President: Warren G. Harding; Calvin Coolidge
- Preceded by: Thomas J. Spellacy
- Succeeded by: Ira Lloyd Letts

Member of the New York State Senate, 18th District
- In office 1917–1918
- Preceded by: William M. Bennett
- Succeeded by: Salvatore A. Cotillo

Personal details
- Born: September 10, 1878 New York City, US
- Died: January 13, 1938 (aged 59) New York City, US
- Resting place: Union Field Cemetery, Ridgewood, Queens, New York
- Party: Republican
- Relations: Richard Ottinger (nephew)
- Parents: Moses Ottinger; Amelia Gottlieb Ottinger
- Education: New York University Law School
- Profession: Attorney

Albert E. Ottinger (September 10, 1878 – January 13, 1938) was an American lawyer and politician.

== Life and career ==
Ottinger was born in Manhattan, New York City, the son of Moses Ottinger and Amelia Gottlieb Ottinger. He graduated from New York University Law School in 1898 and became an attorney in New York City.

He was a member of the New York State Senate (18th District) in 1917 and 1918; and then an assistant attorney general of the United States. As such, Ottinger ruled that the U.S. Congress could grant independence to the Philippines if it wished, since the Philippines were an "insular possession" and therefore to be distinguished from the United States' states and territorial possessions.

He was New York State attorney general from 1925 to 1928, elected in 1924 and 1926. During his second term, he was the only Republican who held state office, and was responsible for closing down the notorious "bucket shops" on Wall Street. He was a delegate to the 1928 and 1932 Republican National Conventions.

In 1928, while the Democratic Party nominated New York Governor Al Smith for the presidency, the first time a Catholic from a major party was running for that office, the Republican Party of New York nominated Ottinger for governor, the first Jewish gubernatorial candidate in New York history. The Democratic Party nominated Franklin D. Roosevelt for governor, and Herbert Lehman, also a Jew, as the candidate for lieutenant governor of New York. On the national ticket, Herbert Hoover won by a landslide over Al Smith, the latter's religion clearly a national issue. The gubernatorial contest, however, was one of the closest in New York history. Against the national Republican trend, Roosevelt won by only 25,000 votes, less than 1% of the four million ballots cast.

At the end of his term as New York state's attorney general, Ottinger summed up his record as follows: "Hammer, hammer, hammer, at every manner and means of fraud and dishonesty, the prevention and assertion of which the Legislature has assigned to the Attorney General."

Ottinger had a heart attack and died in New York City on January 13, 1938.

== Family ==
Ottinger never married and was survived by three brothers: Leon, Lawrence, and Nathan. Nathan Ottinger was a justice of the New York Supreme Court. Lawrence Ottinger was the father of Richard Ottinger, who served as a member of the United States House of Representatives.

== See also ==
- List of Jewish American jurists
- 1918-1920 New York City rent strikes § Ottinger law

== Sources ==
- Obit notice, in Time magazine on January 24, 1938
- List of New York attorneys general, at Office of the NYSAG

New York State Senate
Preceded by William M. Bennett	New York State Senate; 18th District; 1917–1918	Succeeded by Salvatore A. Cotillo
Legal offices
Preceded by Thomas J. Spellacy	United States Assistant Attorney General; 1921–1924	Succeeded by Ira Lloyd Letts
Preceded by Carl Sherman	New York Attorney General; 1925–1928	Succeeded by Hamilton Ward Jr.
Party political offices
Preceded by Erskine C. Rogers	Republican nominee for Attorney General of New York; 1924, 1926	Succeeded by Hamilton Ward Jr.
Preceded by Ogden L. Mills	Republican Nominee for Governor of New York; 1928	Succeeded by Charles H. Tuttle
