= Francis Miles Finch =

American judge

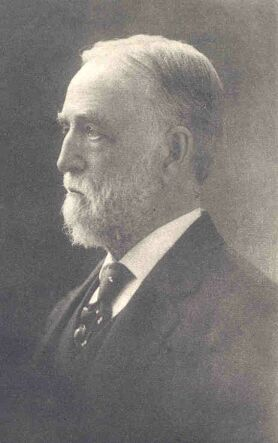
Francis Miles Finch

Francis Miles Finch (June 9, 1827 – July 31, 1907) was an American judge, poet, and academic associated with the early years of Cornell University. One of his poems, "The Blue and the Gray", is frequently reprinted to this day.

== Biography ==
Francis Miles Finch was born on June 9, 1827, in Ithaca, New York. He was educated at Yale University, where, according to a contemporary, he was a "thoughtful scholar in the class-room, a prizeman in the essay competitions, an influential editor of the Yale Lit an impressive speaker in the Linonian Society, hail-fellow-well-met on the campus, sedate, impulsive, big-hearted, wise, witty, everywhere he was the ideal collegian." Because of his achievements, he became a member of Skull and Bones. Having been graduated in 1849, he returned to Ithaca, became a lawyer, and speedily distinguished himself in his profession. He soon became as a speaker in the political campaigns which preceded and followed the Civil War.

He was a friend of Ezra Cornell and Andrew Dickson White, and at the organization of Cornell University, he became warmly interested in the institution, was one of its trustees, and its counsel and friendly adviser through its early troubles. As Secretary of the Board of Trustees, Finch was left in charge when both Cornell and White were travelling out of town. He also lent the university his literary skills, as a contemporary relates: "His indignation at the attacks upon Mr. Cornell by the enemies of the university aroused him to fight strenuously and successfully in the courts, in the press, and in public meetings, while the music of the university chime, heard at dawn, noon, and nightfall above the ripple or roar of the adjacent waters, inspired him to write songs which have been sung by Cornell students from their first arrival forty years ago until the present hour."

Early in Ulysses S. Grant's first presidential term (circa 1870), he was appointed collector of internal revenue for the Twenty-sixth District, New York, which office he resigned after holding it for four years.

In May 1880, he was appointed a judge of the New York Court of Appeals to fill the vacancy caused by the appointment of Charles J. Folger as Chief Judge. In January 1881, he was re-appointed to fill the vacancy that continued after Folger's election as Chief Judge in November 1880. In November 1881, Finch was elected to a full fourteen-year term, and remained in office until December 31, 1895. He lectured at the Cornell's School of Law from 1887 onwards, and on the death of Hon. Douglass Boardman in the year 1891, was unanimously elected as dean of the Law School.

Finch wrote poetry throughout his life, but declined a chair in rhetoric literature at Cornell, thinking his poetry was "only incidents along the line of a busy and laborious life." Perhaps his best known poem, "The Blue and the Gray", written in remembrance of the dead of the American Civil War, was inspired by a women's memorial association in Columbus, Mississippi, who on April 25, 1866, tended the graves of Confederate and Union soldiers, treating the dead as equals despite the lingering rancor of the war.

Francis Finch was married May 25, 1853 to Elizabeth A. Brook, who died on March 28, 1892. They had three children: a son, Robert Brooke, and two daughters, Mary Sibley and Helen Elizabeth. He died in 1907, and a collection of his poems, The Blue and the Gray, and other verses, was published by friends two years posthumously in 1909.

== Notes ==
- This article contains text from Landmarks of Tompkins County, New York, a publication in the public domain
- This article contains text from The Blue and the Gray, and other verses, a publication in the public domain
