= Ira Davenport (politician) =

American politician (1841–1904)

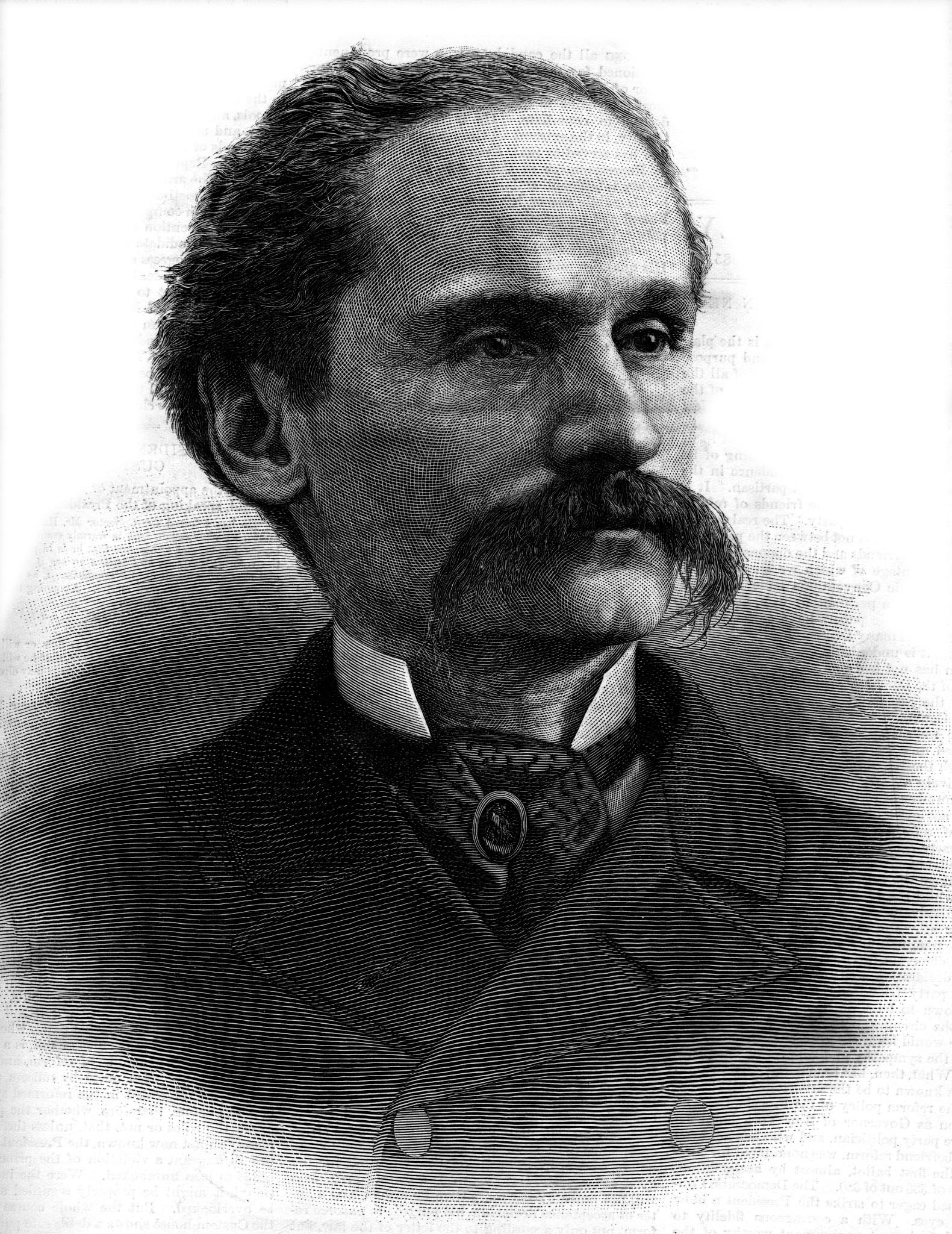

Member of the U.S. House of Representatives from New York's 29th district
- In office March 4, 1885 – March 3, 1889
- Preceded by: John Arnot Jr.
- Succeeded by: John Raines

New York State Comptroller
- In office 1882–1883
- Governor: Alonzo B. Cornell; Grover Cleveland
- Preceded by: James Wolcott Wadsworth
- Succeeded by: Alfred C. Chapin

New York State Senate (27th Dist.)
- In office 1878–1881
- Preceded by: George B. Bradley
- Succeeded by: Sumner Baldwin

Personal details
- Born: June 28, 1841 Hornellsville, New York
- Died: October 6, 1904 (aged 63) Bath, New York
- Resting place: Davenport Family Cemetery, Bath, New York
- Party: Republican
- Spouse: Katherine L. Sharpe (m. 1887-1904, his death)
- Relations: George H. Sharpe (father in law)
- Education: Russell Collegiate School
- Occupation: Businessman

Ira Davenport (June 28, 1841 – October 6, 1904) was an American businessman, philanthropist and Republican Party politician from the state of New York. He represented New York's 27th State Senate district from 1878 to 1881 and New York's 29th congressional district in the United States House of Representatives from 1885 to 1889. He also served as New York State Comptroller from 1882 to 1883.

In 1885, Davenport was the Republican nominee for governor of New York. He narrowly lost the election to incumbent David B. Hill.

== Early life ==
Ira Davenport was born on June 28, 1841 in Hornellsville, New York, the son of Ira Davenport (1795-1868) and Lydia Cameron (1800-1842). His family moved to Bath in 1847, and Davenport attended Bath's Haverling Academy and the Russell Collegiate School in New Haven, Connecticut.

Davenport's father owned and operated a large estate and was active in numerous business ventures including stores, farms, lumber, freight transportation, and real estate speculation. After his father's death, Davenport took over management of these enterprises.

== Political career ==
He was a member of the New York State Senate (27th D.) from 1878 to 1881, sitting in the 101st, 102nd, 103rd and 104th New York State Legislatures. He was New York State Comptroller from 1882 to 1883, elected in 1881, but defeated for re-election in 1883 by Democrat Alfred C. Chapin.

Davenport was a member of the 49th and 50th United States Congresses, holding office from March 4, 1885 to March 3, 1889. He was the Republican candidate for Governor of New York in the 1885 election, and was defeated by Democrat David B. Hill.

== Death and burial ==
Davenport died in Bath on October 6, 1904. He was buried at the Davenport Family Cemetery in Bath.

== Family ==
On April 27, 1887 in Kingston, New York, Davenport married Katherine Lawrence Sharpe (1860-1945), the daughter of George H. Sharpe. She was the granddaughter of Abraham Bruyn Hasbrouck, great-granddaughter of Abraham J. Hasbrouck and a descendant of Louis DuBois. They had no children.

== Legacy ==
The Davenport family's charitable donations included founding a home for orphaned girls, which was financed by the senior Ira Davenport and his brother Charles, and supported by Ira Davenport Jr. Once closed after 94 years of operation, the orphanage's assets endowed Bath's Ira Davenport Memorial Hospital, which was named after the senior Ira Davenport. The younger Ira Davenport was a founder of the Bath Soldiers' and Sailors' Home and the town's public library. From 1906 to 1999 (when a new facility opened), the library was named for Ira Junior. The Davenports also made substantial contributions to fund Bath's monumental First Presbyterian Church, with its Tiffany sanctuary. A small Davenport Park in Bath is named for the family, and a squash court at Amherst College is named for Ira Junior's brother John.

== Sources ==
=== Books ===
- Hall, Henry (1896). America's Successful Men of Affairs. Vol. 2. New York, NY: New York Tribune.
- Spencer, Thomas E. (1998). Where They're Buried. Baltimore, MD: Clearfield Company. p. 236. ISBN 978-0-8063-4823-0.

=== Newspapers ===
- "Ira Davenport A Candidate". Buffalo Express. Buffalo, NY. September 5, 1885 – via Newspapers.com.
- "Ira Davenport Is Dead". Buffalo Express. Buffalo, NY. October 7, 1904 – via Newspapers.com.
- Beeney, Bill (October 5, 1959). "His Philanthropy in 1863 Provides Modern Hospital Today". Democrat and Chronicle. Rochester, NY – via Newspapers.com.

Party political offices
Preceded by Charles J. Folger	Republican nominee for Governor of New York; 1885	Succeeded by Warner Miller
New York State Senate
Preceded by George B. Bradley	New York State Senate; 27th District; 1878–1881	Succeeded by Sumner Baldwin
Political offices
Preceded by James W. Wadsworth	New York State Comptroller; 1882–1883	Succeeded by Alfred C. Chapin
U.S. House of Representatives
Preceded by John Arnot, Jr.	Member of the U.S. House of Representatives from New York's 29th congressional district 1885–1889	Succeeded by John Raines
