= Frank Kimball =

Frank Kimball may refer to:

- Frank A. Kimball (1832–1913), founder of National City, California
- Frank J. Kimball (1846–1927), Republican politician from Wisconsin

== See also ==
- Francis Kimball
