= Oaks Historic District =

Oaks Historic District or variations may refer to:

in the United States

(by state then city)

- Oaks Historic District (Hattiesburg, Mississippi), listed on the NRHP in Mississippi
- The Oaks Historic District (Merchantville, New Jersey), listed on the NRHP in New Jersey
- White Oaks Historic District, White Oaks, New Mexico, listed on the NRHP in New Mexico
- Oaks Historic District (Beaumont, Texas), a neighborhood in Beaumont, Texas, featuring homes from the 1920s to 1950s
- Boulevard Oaks Historic District, Houston, Texas, listed on the NRHP in Texas
- Bonnie Oaks Historic District, Briggsville, Wisconsin, listed on the NRHP in Wisconsin
