= 351st Regiment =

351st Regiment may refer to:

- 351st Infantry Regiment, United States
- 351st Medium Regiment RA (Midland)
