= Margery Latimer =

American novelist and short story writer (1899–1932)

Margery Bodine Latimer Toomer
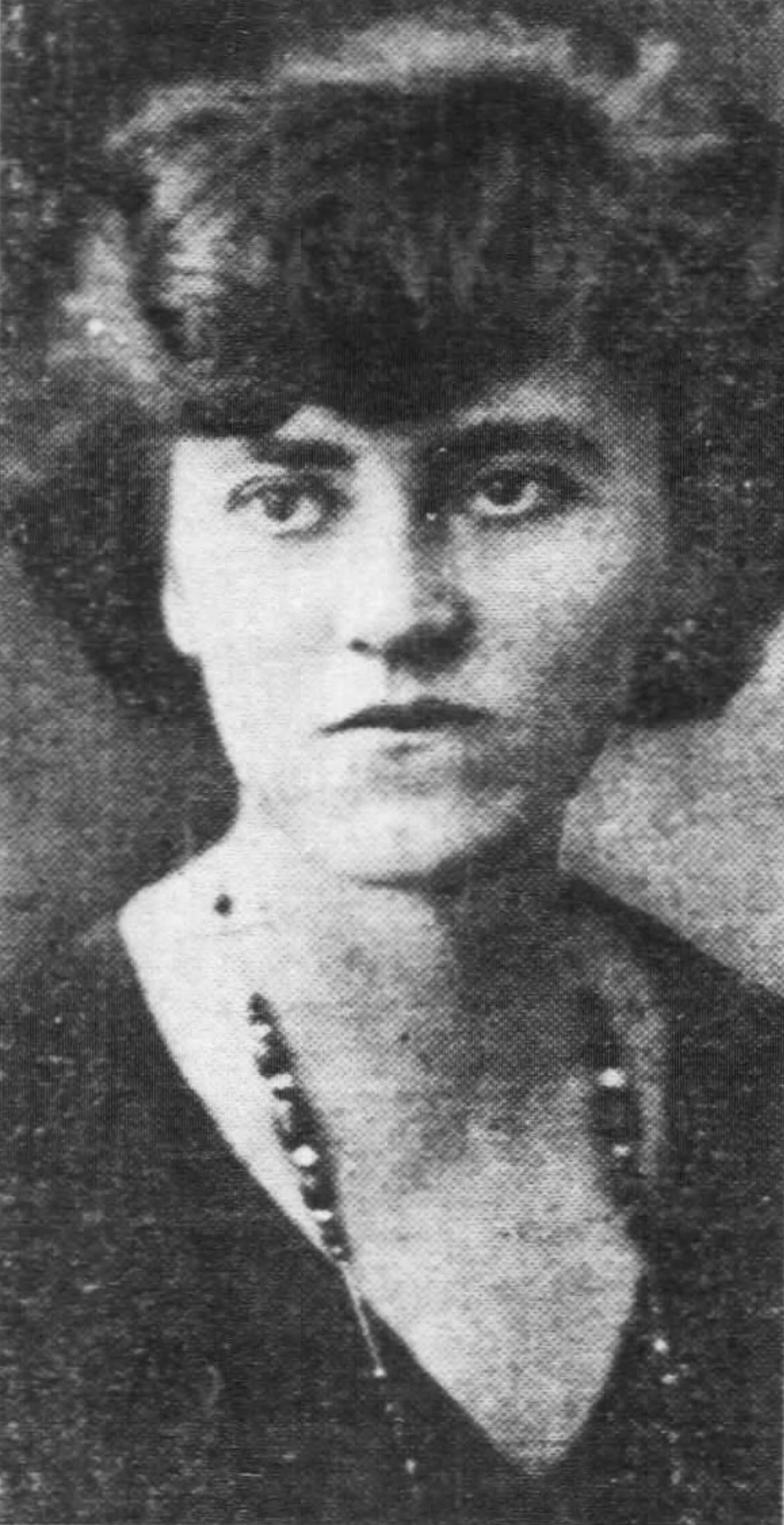
- Margery Latimer, undated portrait photo
- Born: February 6, 1899; Portage, Wisconsin
- Died: August 16, 1932 (aged 33); Chicago, Illinois
- Occupations: Novelist, writer
- Spouse: Jean Toomer
- Children: 1
- Writing career
- Notable works: We Are Incredible, This is My Body
- Literary movement: Feminist literature

Margery Bodine Latimer (February 6, 1899 – August 16, 1932), born in Portage, Wisconsin, was an American novelist and short-story writer. She moved to New York City before finishing college and became involved in its cultural life. Latimer published two highly acclaimed novels, We Are Incredible (1928) and This is My Body (1930), and two collections of short stories, Nellie Bloom and Other Stories (1929), and Guardian Angel and Other Stories (1932). (This was reprinted in new editions in 1971 and 1984.)

Her formally experimental fiction was greatly influenced by the modernism of the 1920s. Reviewers of the period compared her to Gertrude Stein, James Joyce, and D. H. Lawrence. Her work reflects feminist, socialist, and anti-racist ideals.

== Personal background ==
Latimer was the younger daughter of Clark Watt Latimer and Laura Augusta née Bodine. Her Yankee ancestry included New England pioneers Anne Bradstreet and John Cotton.

Latimer published a short story in a local paper in 1917. This caught the attention of her Portage neighbor Zona Gale, a well-known writer, journalist, and suffragist. Gale became the first woman to win the Pulitzer Prize for drama. She became Latimer's mentor and confidante.

Latimer attended Wooster College, but withdrew quickly, then attended the University of Wisconsin–Madison. She withdrew again and moved to New York City, where she started a playwriting course at Columbia University. Gale established a Zona Gale scholarship, tailor-made for Latimer, its first recipient. The younger woman returned to the University of Wisconsin–Madison in 1922. She worked on the campus literary magazine as editor and contributor, and became part of a circle of writers there. She withdrew again in 1923 and returned to New York.

Latimer maintained an intimate correspondence with her mentor until about the time of Gale's marriage in 1928. Admiring Gale greatly, Latimer identified with her and felt betrayed when Gale married. She fictionalized aspects of their complex relationship in the short story "Possession" (Nellie Bloom and Other Stories), the novel We Are Incredible, and the long title story in Guardian Angel and Other Stories, each time treating her mentor more harshly.

While living in New York City's Greenwich Village in the 1920s, Latimer became active in various social causes. She also reported on contemporary politics for The New Masses, a radical journal of the twenties. She lived with poet Kenneth Fearing, her romantic partner, and became friends with writers and artists of the period, such as Georgia O'Keeffe, Walt Kuhn, Meridel Le Sueur, Carl Rakosi, and photographer Carl Van Vechten.

== Literary career ==
Before her first novel was published in 1928, Latimer had stories published in Century, The American Caravan, The Bookman (New York) and other journals.

Her essay, "The New Freedom", was published in 1924 in The Reviewer. According to scholar Joy Castro, it casts women as "potential literary progenitors". Latimer writes of "the word ... made flesh, and it is flesh with a mind of its own, infused with the possibility of change..."

Latimer's novels, We Are Incredible (1928) and This is My Body (1930), were highly acclaimed. Her debut novel received notices in the New York Times, McCall's, The Saturday Review of Literature, Chicago Tribune, and others.

In addition, she published two collections of short stories, Nellie Bloom and Other Stories (1929), and Guardian Angel and Other Stories (1932).

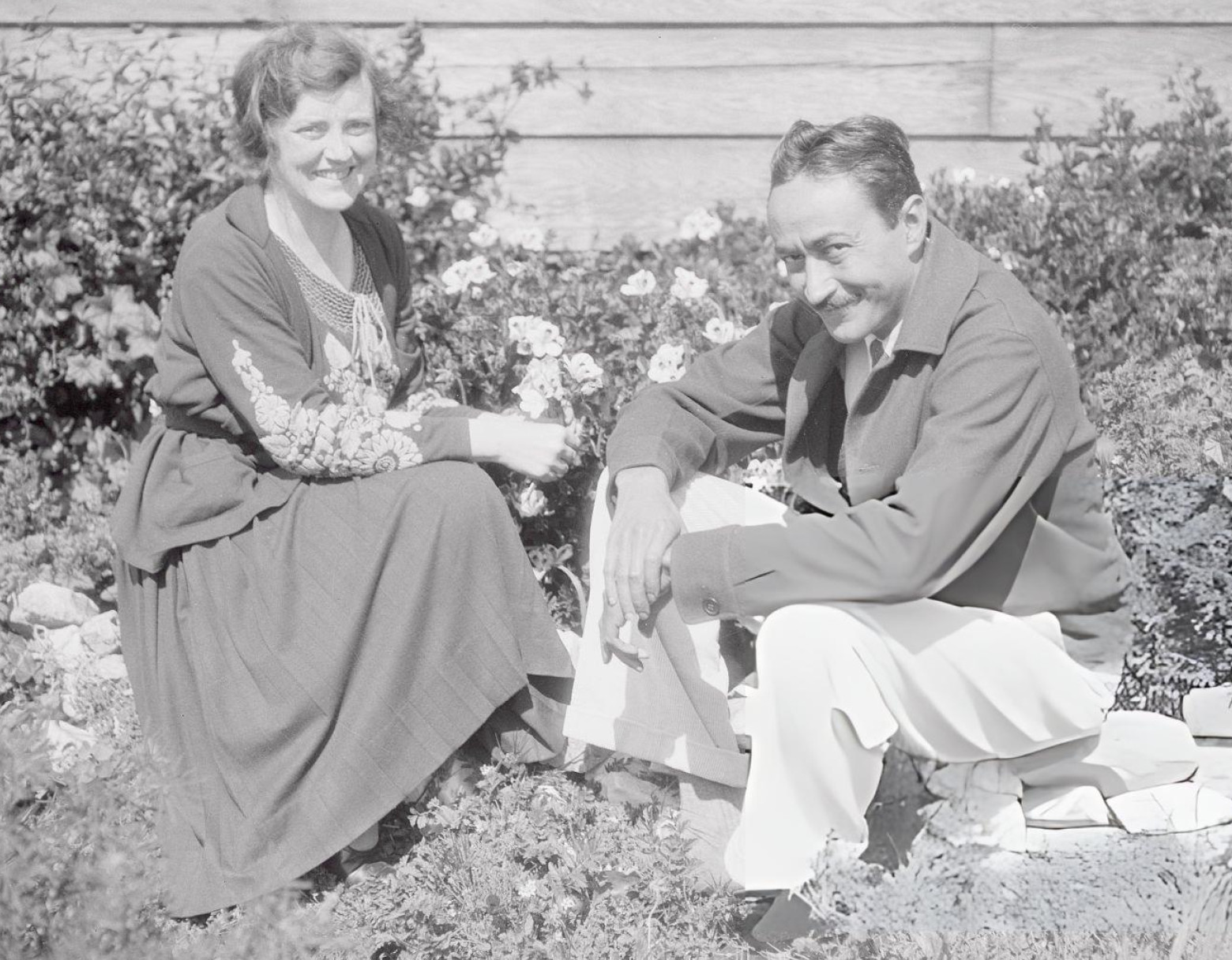
Latimer and Jean Toomer in 1932

== Communal experiment ==
In New York, Latimer met Jean Toomer, a writer associated with modernism and the Harlem Renaissance. Of mixed race and majority-white ancestry, he was known for his first novel, Cane (1923), a modernist exploration of his paternal African-American roots in Georgia. But he was determined to resist being classified as a Negro writer, saying he was "an American." He moved on to other topics.

From 1924 Toomer had been deeply involved in the Gurdjieff movement in the United States. To test Gurdjieffian ideas of harmonious living, in 1931 Latimer and Toomer, with six other unmarried people, moved to the farm at Bonnie Oaks near Briggsville, Wisconsin.

The goal was, in Toomer's words,

"to eradicate the false veneer of civilization, with its unnatural inhibition, its selfishness, petty meanness and unnatural behavior.... Adults can be re-educated to become as natural as little children...."

While the participants seemed to enjoy the experiment, the neighbors in the countryside and in Portage were scandalized. Talk of communism, nudity, and sexual license abounded, spiked by Toomer's being of mixed race; hostility arose among the locals. By the end of the summer of 1931, Toomer ended the experiment and documented its demise in his unpublished Portage Potential.

== Marriage, childbirth, and death ==
In October 1931, Latimer and Toomer married at her home in Portage. They left on a wedding trip for Santa Fe, New Mexico, and Pasadena and Carmel, California. They were staying in Carmel when a nationwide, anti-miscegenation scandal broke concerning their marriage, fanned by a sensationalist, exaggerated Hearst newspaper story. (Note: Castro points out that the Time article is listed under a "RACES" section (a subsection of "NATIONAL AFFAIRS"), and not "BOOKS" or "PEOPLE." The other article in "RACES" is about the murder of a white woman by a young Apache—the two apparently had had sex.) Because of threats and hate mail, Latimer's parents moved out of Portage temporarily and stayed with their older daughter Rachel in Montana.

Latimer became pregnant and the couple settled in Chicago, where they took an apartment. During a physical examination, Latimer learned that she had a heart leak. Despite this, she gave birth at home. Shortly after holding her daughter, Latimer hemorrhaged and lapsed into a coma. She died twelve hours later.

Toomer named their daughter Margery after his wife. Two years later, the widower remarried, to Marjorie Content, a white photographer. They retired from public life and in 1940 settled in Doylestown, Pennsylvania, where they joined a Quaker meeting.

== Sources ==
- Castro, Joy (2000), "Margery Latimer (1899-1932)", in Champion, Laurie (ed.), American Women Writers, 1900-1945, Westport, Connecticut: Greenwood Press, pp. 192–197
