= Francis Kimball =

Francis Kimball may refer to:

- Francis D. Kimball (1820–1856), American Republican politician from Ohio
- Francis H. Kimball (1845–1919), American architect

== See also ==
- Frank A. Kimball (1832–1913), American businessman and horticulturalist.
- Frank J. Kimball (1846–1927), American Republican politician from Wisconsin
