= Douglas Center, Wisconsin =

- Unincorporated community
- Location within Wisconsin Location within the United States
- Coordinates: 43°42′03″N 89°33′19″W
- Country: United States
- State: Wisconsin
- County: Marquette
- Elevation: 830 ft (250 m)
- Time zone: UTC-6 (Central (CST))
  - Summer (DST): UTC-5 (CDT)
- Area code: 608
- GNIS feature ID: 1562201

Douglas Center (at one time spelled Douglass Center) is an unincorporated community in Marquette County, Wisconsin, United States, between Briggsville and Oxford, in the town of Douglas, on County Road P between County Roads A and O. It was formerly the site of a post office, and the home of State Representative Robert Mitchell.
