= Cyrus Woodman =

American lawyer

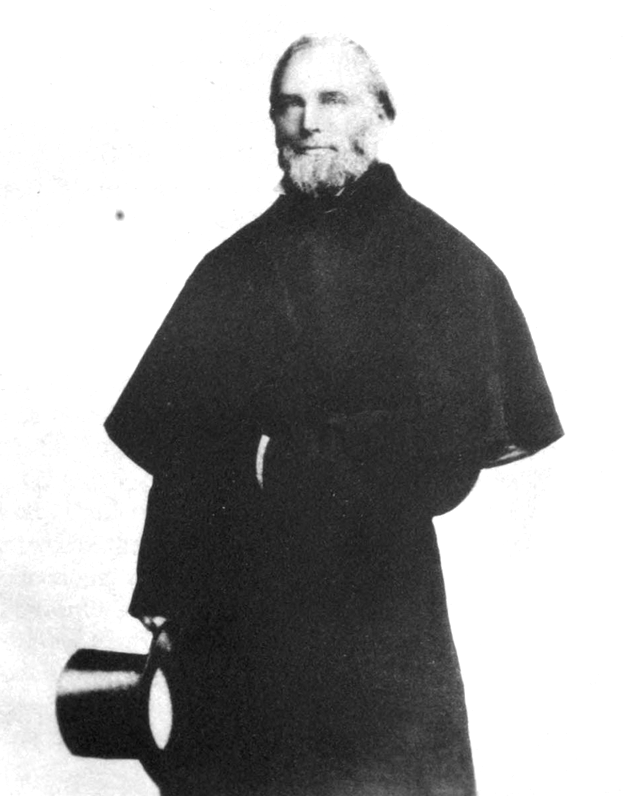
- Born: June 2, 1814; Buxton, Maine
- Died: March 30, 1889 (aged 74); Cambridge, Massachusetts
- Occupation: Lawyer
- Known for: Wisconsin land speculator

Cyrus Woodman (June 2, 1814 – March 30, 1889) was a lawyer, businessman and land speculator whose business affairs were influential in the State of Wisconsin. He was native of Buxton, Maine, and a graduate of Bowdoin College and Harvard Law School. He was a charter member of the Wisconsin Historical Society and an associate and close friend of the Wisconsin politician Cadwallader C. Washburn. In semi-retirement after 1864 he lived in Cambridge, Massachusetts.

== Life and career ==
Woodman was born in Buxton, Maine, on June 2, 1814, the oldest of five children of Joseph Woodman and Susanna Coffin Woodman. His father was a farmer and one-time member of the legislature in Massachusetts before Maine became an independent state. Cyrus attended Bowdoin College, graduating in 1836, and received his law degree from Harvard in 1838.

In 1840 Woodman went to Illinois as an employee of the Boston Land Company. Within six months his immediate superior resigned, and he was named agent of the company, a position he held until the company dissolved in 1843. In 1844 he moved to Mineral Point, Wisconsin, where the federal land office for that territory was located, and entered into a partnership with Cadwallader Washburn. Within a few short years, the partners amassed immense land holdings throughout the state. This included his property now known as Bonnie Oaks. In 1847 they bought the Helena shot tower, originally built by Daniel Whitney. In 1852 Washburn was called upon by the Governor Leonard J. Farwell to formulate the new Wisconsin banking laws, and with the inside knowledge thus gained, Woodman and Washburn formed the Mineral Point Bank. In association with the Holloway Bank of Maine, they issued $47,000 worth of bank notes which became a major form of circulating currency on the upper Mississippi. When Washburn was elected to Congress in 1854, the partners amicably dissolved the partnership, closed the bank, and paid off all the outstanding notes. It was a fortuitous time to do so because in 1857 a major financial crisis wrecked many similar banks.

In 1856, Woodman took his family on an extended tour of Europe. His children were educated by some of the best tutors in Europe. While there he kept up active correspondence with Washburn. Woodman was never politically active, but even from Europe he was swept up in the pre-Civil War maelstrom as these letters showed. In addition, he expressed an abiding appreciation for the freedom of speech that was so much more common in the United States than it was in continental Europe, especially when it came to the ability to criticize government officials.

In 1859 the family returned to the United States. He moved to Mineral Point, although his family settled in Cambridge, Massachusetts. In 1861 he was elected to the Wisconsin Legislature, but since he did not seek the office and his business interests were taking him elsewhere, he resigned before taking office. From 1862 to 1864 he resided in Detroit, while working for the St. Mary's Ship Canal Company and the Michigan Pine Lands Association. In 1864 he returned to Cambridge, where for the balance of his life he engaged in historical research and writing.

While living in Cambridge, Woodman never completely gave up his interest or involvement in the West. For a brief period of time, he was employed by the Burlington and Missouri River Railroad company. In 1867 he filed suit to stop the Kilbourn Manufacturing company from building their dam at Wisconsin Dells. In 1889, shortly before his death, he took a trip with the Milwaukee capitalists William H. Bradley, of the Tomahawk Land and Boom Company, and Wallace G. Collins, of the Chicago, Milwaukee and St. Paul Railroad, to survey and assess pine lands in the State of Washington.

Woodman married Charlotte Flint, another Maine native, in Fremont, Illinois, in 1842. They had six children, two of whom died in infancy.

Although he only spent 16 years in Wisconsin, his ties to that state remained strong. While he lived there he was a founding member and one time vice-president of the State Historical Society. His personal records are on deposit at that institution. He also made an endowment in his will to fund the library of the Astronomy Department at the University of Wisconsin.
