= Bonnie Oaks Historic District =

Historic district in Wisconsin, United States

- U.S. National Register of Historic Places
- U.S. Historic district
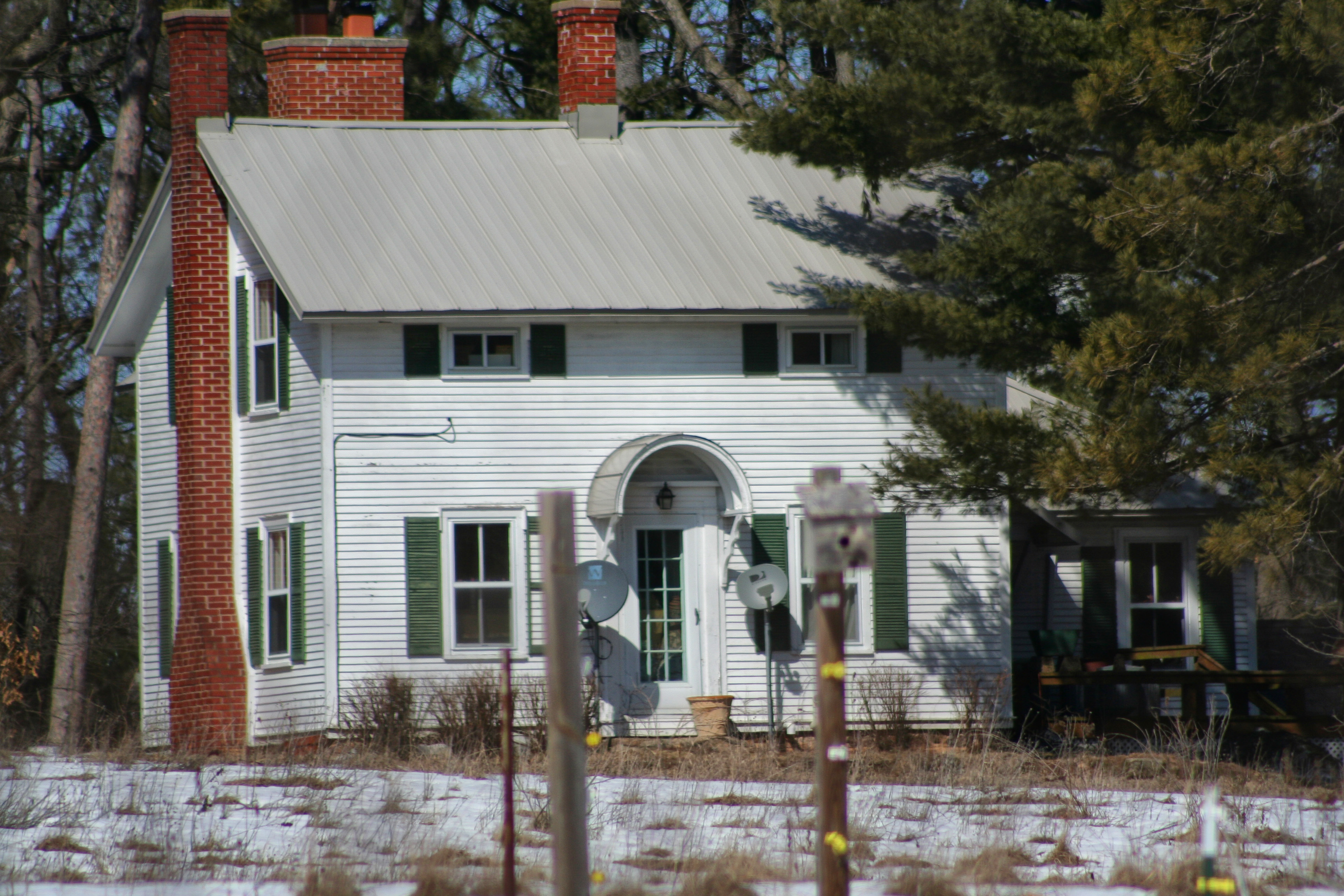

- Location within Wisconsin Location within the United States
- Location: Briggsville, Wisconsin
- Coordinates: 43.6514520°N 89.5609046°W
- Area: 28 acres (11 ha)
- NRHP reference No.: 86000626
- Added to NRHP: April 3, 1986

The Bonnie Oaks Historic District is located in Briggsville, Wisconsin in the Town of Douglas. The district was added to the National Register of Historic Places on April 3, 1986.

== History ==
The Bonnie Oaks Historic District consists of fifteen structures and one archaeological site. All of the buildings were built between 1870 and 1930.

=== Literature and Music ===
The site has significance in the fields of literature and music for the role it played as an informal artists' retreat. The original owner of the site was Cyrus Woodman, who obtained it in 1853 as a military land warrant from the federal government. After going through a few owners, the property eventually passed to Alma and John Ormsby. Alma gave it the title of Bonnie Oaks and John built many of the structures that are currently on the property. The Ormsbys' daughter Mildred who was born at Bonnie Oaks, married a Milwaukee lawyer named Harrison S. Green in 1897. Following her father's death in 1916, the Greens became the owners of the property. During this time, the property attracted young authors to spend time there.

In 1922 Mildred Ormsby Green invited pianist Josef Lhévinne to Bonnie Oaks. For the next twenty-two years until the time of his death Lhévinne spent a part of each summer in the Tower on the property.

Zona Gale, author of Miss Lulu Bett, and a native of Portage, frequently stayed at the property. She as well as Mrs. Green encouraged other authors including William Maxwell and Margery Latimer to come to Bonnie Oaks. Latimer was a believer in Gurdjieff philosophy, which was created by Russian philosopher, George Gurdjieff. In 1930 Latimer involved Zona Gale in Gurdjieff's philosophy and partook the "Portage Experiment". The experiment was conducted by Gale, Latimer, her husband Jean Toomer and multiple other unmarried people that lived together. It was declared by the press as a "free-love" cult, and charges of miscegenation were made. While the participants seemed to enjoy the experiment, the neighbors in the countryside and in Portage were hostile to the idea. Talk of communism, nudity, and sexual lenience abounded. By the end of the summer of 1931, the experiment was ended and the results were documented by Toomer.

Other visitors to the property include Robert Fitzgerald and Paul Robeson.

=== Effigy Mounds ===
There are two effigy mounds at the archaeological site on the property. They are thought to be from the Woodland period and are listed as virtually undisturbed. The sites are among the better preserved in the state and may provide information on social relations and mortuary customs of the time.

== Location ==
The district is located in the southwest corner of Marquette County, with the community of Briggsville a little over a mile to the west. The Neenah Creek forms the eastern boundary of the district, with the rest of the property found in dense woods, between 3rd Ave. and Grouse Dr.
