= William W. Eagles =

United States Army general (1895–1988)

William Willis Eagles
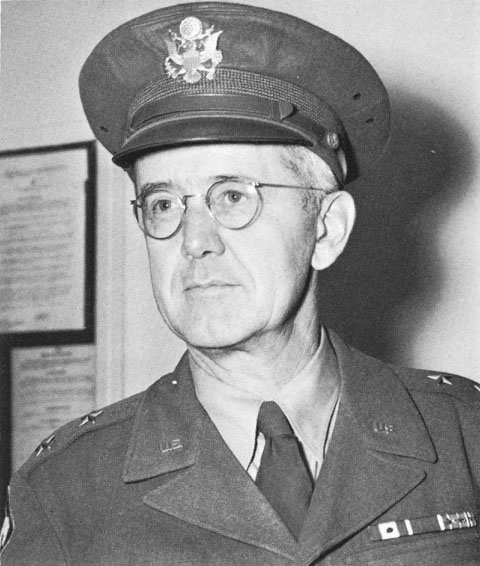
- Born: January 12, 1895; Albion, Indiana, United States
- Died: February 19, 1988 (aged 93); Bethesda, Maryland, United States
- Burial place: Arlington National Cemetery, Virginia, United States
- Military career
- Allegiance: United States
- Branch: United States Army
- Service years: 1917–1953
- Rank: Major General
- Service number: 0-5270
- Unit: Infantry Branch
- Commands: 9th Infantry Division; 45th Infantry Division; 351st Infantry Regiment
- Conflicts: World War I World War II
- Awards: Army Distinguished Service Medal (2); Bronze Star; Purple Heart

Major General William Willis Eagles (January 12, 1895 − February 19, 1988) was a decorated officer in the United States Army. A graduate of the United States Military Academy (USMA), he is most noted for his service during World War II as Commanding General (CG) of the 45th Infantry Division from 1943 to 1944.

Following the end of the war, Eagles remained in the army and served as CG of the 9th Infantry Division, following by CG Ryukyus Command, Okinawa or Inspector-General of the Army's European Command, before retiring from military service in 1953.

== Early life and military career ==
William Willis Eagles was born on January 12, 1895, in Albion, Indiana, as the son of Edward and Maud Eagles. He graduated from Albion High School in May 1913 and received an appointment to the United States Military Academy (USMA) at West Point, New York, soon afterwards. He graduated, 62nd in a class of 139, from there in April 1917, shortly after the American entry into World War I, with a Bachelor's degree and was commissioned as a second lieutenant in the Infantry Branch of the United States Army.

Eagles did not go overseas during World War I; he remained stateside, serving mainly with the 21st Infantry Regiment. He rose to the rank of first lieutenant in May 1917 and then to captain in August and later assumed duty as an instructor at the Army Infantry School at Fort Benning, Georgia in early 1921. He then served as Professor of Military Science & Tactics at Ripon College in Ripon, Wisconsin, for five years and returned to the Infantry School as an instructor with the permanent rank of captain. He was promoted to major on October 1, 1932, while in this capacity.

He was ordered to the instruction at Army Command and General Staff School at Fort Leavenworth, Kansas, in June 1935. One year later, Eagles was ordered to Fort Sam Houston, Texas, where he joined the headquarters of 8th Corps Area under Major General Herbert J. Brees as Officer-in-Charge of Supply, Construction & Budget. He was promoted to lieutenant colonel on July 1, 1940.

== World War II ==
By the beginning of November 1940, Eagles was attached to the headquarters, VIII Corps, commanded by Major General George V. Strong and located at Fort Sam Houston. Eagles was promoted to the temporary rank of colonel on December 11, 1941, just four days after the Japanese attack on Pearl Harbor and the German declaration of war against the United States, which brought the country into World War II.

Eagles was ordered to Camp Gruber, Oklahoma, and in May 1942 he assumed command of the 351st Infantry Regiment, part of the newly raised 88th Infantry Division. He held that command for just less than two months, however, as he was promoted to the temporary rank of brigadier general on July 23, 1942, and succeeded Brigadier General Eugene M. Landrum as the assistant division commander (ADC) of the 3rd Infantry Division, then commanded by Major General Jonathan W. Anderson.

While attached to the 3rd Infantry Division, he was co-responsible for the training and preparation of men for combat deployment overseas. Eagles accompanied his division to North Africa during Operation Torch, the Allied invasion of North Africa, at the beginning of November 1942 and participated in the combats in Morocco and Tunis. The 3rd Infantry Division, now commanded by Major General Lucian Truscott, later landed on Sicily in July 1943 and participated in the liberation of Palermo and Messina. For his service with the 3rd Infantry Division, Eagles received the Bronze Star. The division then took part in the early stages of the bitter Italian campaign, which the Allies had invaded in September 1943, helping to breach the Volturno Line in October.

Eagles was promoted to the rank of major general on November 4, 1943, and relieved Major General Troy H. Middleton in command of the 45th Infantry Division, an Army National Guard formation recruiting largely from Oklahoma, who was promoted to the command of VIII Corps in England in preparation for the Normandy landings. Brigadier General John W. O'Daniel succeeded Eagles as ADC of the 3rd Division. Aided by Brigadier General Paul C. Paschal as his ADC, Eagles led the 45th Division during the latter phases of the Anzio landings (codenamed Operation Shingle) in late January 1944. This was followed in the next few weeks by severe static fighting, similar to the trench warfare which had characterized so much of the fighting on the Western Front during most of World War I, in the Anzio beachhead, and then during the breakout from the Anzio beachhead towards the end of May and which ultimately led to the subsequent liberation of the Italian capital of Rome in early June. After having endured so much heavy fighting, the division was withdrawn from combat soon afterwards. For his services so far during the campaign in Italy, Eagles was decorated with the Army Distinguished Service Medal, together with the Order of Saints Maurice and Lazarus and the Bronze Medal of Valor by the government of Italy. The citation for the Army DSM reads:

The President of the United States of America, authorized by Act of Congress July 9, 1918, takes pleasure in presenting the Army Distinguished Service Medal to Major General William Willis Eagles (ASN: 0-5270), United States Army, for exceptionally meritorious and distinguished services to the Government of the United States, in a duty of great responsibility as Commanding General of the 45th Infantry Division, from 22 November 1943 to 7 June 1944.

After being withdrawn, the 45th Division, under Eagles, began conducting training in amphibious warfare, having been selected to participate in the Allied invasion of Southern France (codenamed Operation Dragoon). The operation began on August 15, 1944, with the 45th landing at St. Maxime. Eagles commanded his 45th Division during the liberation of Epinal and Rambervillers in September of that year, before advancing on to the Vosges mountains. On November 30, Eagles was seriously wounded when the jeep in which he was riding struck a land mine and forced his evacuation to the United States, with his position as commanding general (CG) of the 45th going to Brigadier General Robert T. Frederick, formerly the commander of the First Special Service Force. For his service during Operation Dragoon, Eagles received his second Army Distinguished Service Medal, as well as a Purple Heart. The government of France bestowed him with the Legion of Honour, rank Commander and Croix de guerre 1939-1945 with Palm.

== Postwar service ==
Eagles spent next six months in hospital stateside and was pronounced fit for duty in June 1945, a month after the surrender of Germany. He was ordered to Camp Hood, Texas, and succeeded Brigadier General Thomas F. Bresnahan as commanding general of Infantry Replacement Training Center there. He was reverted to the peacetime rank of colonel by the end of December 1945, but promoted shortly thereafter to brigadier general.

He was appointed President of Interview Boards, Regular Army Integration Program and held that assignment until August 1946, when he was promoted back to major general and assumed command of 9th Infantry Division at Fort Dix, New Jersey. Eagles also held additional duty as commanding general, Fort Dix and was tasked with the demobilization of the troops returning from overseas service.

Eagles was ordered to the Far East in April 1948 and assumed duty as commanding general, Ryukyus Command on Okinawa. While in this capacity, he was responsible for the civil administration of the Ryukyus Islands, reconstruction of infrastructure, repatriation of refugees or prisoners-of-war and held that command until October 1949.

Following his arrival stateside and brief leave at home, he was ordered to Washington, D.C., where he joined Army Personnel Board and served in this capacity until July 1951, when he was ordered to Europe for duty as Inspector-General, U.S. European Command under his West Point classmate, Matthew Ridgway. In February 1952, he was appointed Director of Military Posts Division at the headquarters U.S. European Command and remained in that capacity until January 31, 1953, when he retired from active duty after almost 36 years of commissioned service.

== Retirement and death ==
Upon his retirement from the army, Eagles settled in Washington, D.C., where he lived until his death. Major General William W. Eagles died on February 19, 1988, aged 93, in Suburban Hospital in Bethesda, Maryland. He was buried with full military honors at Arlington National Cemetery, Virginia. His wife, Dorothy Van Slyck (1897–1997) is buried beside him. They have a son, Edward, and a daughter, Anne.

== Decorations ==
The ribbon bar of Major General William W. Eagles:

1st Row	Army Distinguished Service Medal with Oak Leaf Cluster			Bronze Star Medal
2nd Row	Purple Heart	World War I Victory Medal	American Defense Service Medal	American Campaign Medal
3rd Row	European-African-Middle Eastern Campaign Medal with four 3/16 inch service stars and Arrowhead device	World War II Victory Medal	Army of Occupation Medal	National Defense Service Medal
4th Row	Order of Saints Maurice and Lazarus, Knight (Italy)	Bronze Medal of Military Valor (Italy)	Commander of the Legion of Honor (France)	French Croix de guerre 1939-1945 with Palm

Military offices
Preceded by Troy H. Middleton	Commanding General 45th Infantry Division; 1943–1944	Succeeded by Robert T. Frederick
Preceded by Horace L. McBride	Commanding General 9th Infantry Division; 1947–1948	Succeeded by A. Arnim White
