= We Are Incredible =

1928 novel by Margery Latimer

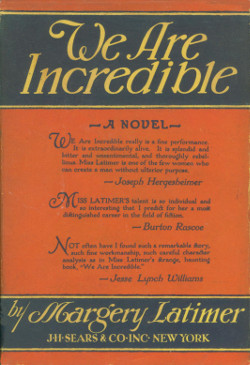
- Cover of the 1st edition
- Author: Margery Latimer
- Language: English
- Genre: Modernism, Feminism
- Published: 1928 (J. H. Sears)
- Media type: Print (Hardback)
- Pages: 283

We Are Incredible is Margery Latimer's first novel, published in 1928. It tells the story of a small-town woman, Hester Linden, and her cult-like influence on a small band of followers, leaving them virtually lifeless. The novel was partly based on the sometimes manipulative influence that Zona Gale had on Latimer. Linden's physical appearance is closely modelled on Gale's.

Latimer died a few years after the novel was published, and her works essentially disappeared. She was rediscovered in the 1980s, and her works have received some critical attention, however, the novel has not been republished.

== Plot summary ==
The novel consists of three parts, each named after a character. The first two parts are from the viewpoint of a follower of Linden, who remains in the background. In the third part, Linden becomes central.

=== Stephen Mitchell ===
Mitchell is a boarder at the Fry house, consisting of Rex and Myrtle, their young children, Gloria and Deva, and Myrtle's unmarried sister, Dora Weck, who has been something of a financial burden on the Frys since the death of Mrs. Weck. Mitchell barely eats, and stays out late, to Myrtle's annoyance. In general, Myrtle finds fault with everything, and the others try to ignore her.

Mitchell is a former follower of Linden (from ten years previously), and Weck is a current follower.

Weck has just gotten engaged to Joe Teeter, who has been sweet on her since high school. Myrtle approves, since he works at his family's creamery and does well. A celebration of sorts follows, with Weck uninterested at first.

Mitchell, Weck, and Mark Johns, another former follower of Linden, pay a visit to Amy Hemingway, also a former follower who has returned from living in Paris. Mitchell and Weck head back to the Frys' along a route that will pass by Linden's house. When Weck questions the choice of route, Mitchell finds himself succumbing to thoughts of Linden, and he lies down in the wet grass.

=== Dora Weck ===
Weck sleeps in, and meditates on how she actually desires Mitchell, not Teeter. Teeter comes over, but Weck says she's busy. Mitchell tries to convince Weck to give up on Linden. Myrtle is encouraging Weck to set a date for her wedding.

Weck and Mitchell go on a picnic together. A kiss is broken up by mosquitoes, flies, and gnats. They flee. Weck tells Mitchell that she loves him. He says there is no such thing.

While babysitting the Fry children together, Mitchell tells Weck his only interest in her is to liberate her from Linden. Myrtle comes home early, highly upset because she has all but proven that Rex is having an affair with his stenographer. Rex sleeps downstairs that night.

That evening, Teeter and Weck are together. Teeter has made arrangements to have a house ready for the two, but he alternates between worshipping Weck and wondering whether she really has any interest in him at all. Upon returning home, Weck tries to sleep, but can't, and hears the arguments when Rex comes home.

Next morning Deva is sick. Weck proves almost useless at being helpful, unable to remember how to make coffee even. Mitchell again tries to interest Weck in deprogramming. Teeter again comes by in the morning, this time with news that his parents will give them a new Buick as a wedding present, and that their marriage license will be ready in five days, to appear in that evening's newspaper.

Weck and Mitchell talk again. Mitchell gets Weck to promise to never return to Linden's, and Weck admits that she will never marry Teeter. Their conversation is interrupted by screaming from upstairs: Deva has died.

The next morning, during the planning of the funeral, there is a phone call for Weck. It is from Linden, and Weck leaves to talk to her in person.

=== Hester Linden ===
Linden wants Weck to repudiate her upcoming marriage to Teeter. Weck is uncertain. Linden berates her maid Agda for wearing glasses, and takes them away. Linden delivers a short feminist speech in the context of a woman running for mayor of their town.

Mitchell shows up, but Linden can hardly remember him. She is suspicious that he and Weck may be interested in each other. They talk, with Mitchell accusing Linden of destroying her followers, and Linden defending her philosophy. Their confrontation ends with Linden letting Weck and Mitchell leave.

The next morning the two are found dead in Linden's garden, "forever young, now forever beautiful."

== Reception ==
Initial reviews were mixed, mostly favorable, with some reservations.

Margery Latimer goes so far as to call her novel We Are Incredible and in her portrait of Hester Linden gives us a brilliantly lighted picture of a lady who actually drove men to death.

— Laurence Stallings, McCall's, August 1928

The psychological implications of the novel might be dwelt on indefinitely, and amateur psychoanalysts should find pleasant controversial pastures here ....

— Gladys Graham, The Saturday Review of Literature, 1928-06-30

"We Are Incredible" presents a new novelist with a remarkably fresh talent for making thoughts and moods dramatic.

— ?, New York Times, 1928-05-28, p. 8

[While] part of it does come up to all of the pre-publication ballyhooings about it, the novel as a whole simply doesn't get its idea across. It is too intricate, too delicate a kind of novel material that she has chosen ....

— ?, Chicago Daily Tribune, 1928-06-16, p. 15
