= Arthur S. Champeny =

United States Army general

Arthur Seymour Champeny
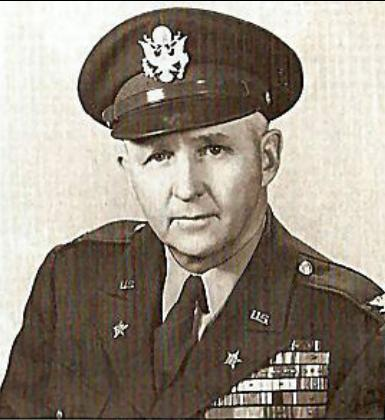
- Born: August 13, 1893; Briggsville, Wisconsin
- Died: April 11, 1979 (aged 85); Wellington, Kansas
- Military career
- Allegiance: United States of America
- Branch: United States Army
- Rank: Brigadier General
- Commands: 351st Infantry Regiment; 24th Infantry Regiment
- Conflicts: World War I World War II; Korean War
- Awards: Distinguished Service Cross (3); Silver Star; Legion of Merit (2); Bronze Star (2); Purple Heart (5); French Croix de Guerre; French Legion of Honor

Arthur Seymour Champeny (August 13, 1893 – April 11, 1979) was a United States Army officer, reaching the rank of brigadier general. He is the only American to earn the Distinguished Service Cross in three different wars. In addition to his three Distinguished Service Crosses, he was awarded the Silver Star, two Legions of Merit, five Purple Hearts, two French Croix de Guerre, the French Legion of Honor, and the Italian Bronze Medal of Military Valor.

== Early life ==
A native of Briggsville, Wisconsin, Champeny was a graduate of Washburn College in Topeka, Kansas. While at Washburn, he was a member of the Kansas Beta chapter of Phi Delta Theta and inducted into the school's exclusive Sagamore Society.

== World War I ==
Champeny earned his first Distinguished Service Cross in September 1918 for bravery near St. Mihiel in the northeast of France, while serving as a 1st lieutenant in the 356th Infantry Regiment, 89th Infantry Division. His Distinguished Service Cross citation reads:

The Distinguished Service Cross is presented to Arthur S. Champeny, Captain, U.S. Army, for extraordinary heroism in action near St. Mihiel, France, September 12, 1918. Assisting the battalion commander, who had been severely wounded in the early fighting, Captain Champeny maintained the liaison personnel, making many journeys himself through heavy shelling. When the battalion commander had been evacuated he assumed command and moved the battalion to its new position.

— General Orders No. 37, W.D., 1919

== World War II ==
Champeny was awarded his second Distinguished Service Cross (or more accurately a first Oak Leaf Cluster to the award) in connection with military operations near Infante Santa Maria in Italy, May 1944. His second Distinguished Service Cross citation reads:

The President of the United States takes pleasure in presenting a Bronze Oak Leaf Cluster in lieu of a Second Award of the Distinguished Service Cross to Arthur S. Champeny (0-8264), Colonel (Infantry), U.S. Army, for extraordinary heroism in connection with military operations against an armed enemy while serving with the 351st Infantry Regiment, 88th Infantry Division, in action against enemy forces from 11 to 14 May 1944. Colonel Champeny's outstanding leadership, personal bravery and zealous devotion to duty exemplify the highest traditions of the military forces of the United States and reflect great credit upon himself, the 88th Infantry Division, and the United States Army.

== Korea ==
Following the end of World War II, Champeny served at South Boston Army Base as regimental commander. Lieutenant General John R. Hodge appointed him the first Director of National Defense in Korea. Though he was still a colonel, he held the rank of a brigadier general while serving in this position. Champeny was the author of the Bamboo Plan to create a police reserve or constabulary of 25,000 men. Champeny was responsible for organizing the Korean Army and Navy and signed the commission documents for its first officers. He was also later the Seoul area commander. Later, Champeny was Deputy Military Governor and then Civil Administrator of Korea.

Following the outbreak of combat, Champeny was named commander of the segregated 24th Infantry Regiment, 25th Division, replacing Colonel Horton V. White. At the time of his appointment, Champeny was 57 years old, making him more than two years older than the division commander.

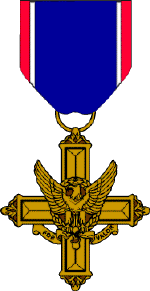
The Distinguished Service Cross

Champeny's command of the regiment was brief and controversial. The day after taking command, Champeny reportedly told members of the regiment's 3rd Battalion that his experience during World War II showed that "coloreds did not make good combat soldiers" and had a "reputation for running". Champeny later defended his comments as an attempt to stir the unit's pride, and the historical evidence is mixed as to its impact. Champeny's defense of his actions did not convince many of the regiment's black troops. "I found Colonel Champeny biased, gutless and totally inefficient."

He was awarded his third Distinguished Service Cross and a fifth Purple Heart for military operations near Haman in Korea, serving as commander of the 24th Infantry Regiment, 25th Infantry Division. The citation reads:

The President of the United States takes pleasure in presenting a Second Bronze Oak Leaf Cluster in lieu of a Third Award of the Distinguished Service Cross to Arthur S. Champeny (0-8264), Colonel (Infantry), U.S. Army, for extraordinary heroism in connection with military operations against an armed enemy of the United Nations while serving as Commanding Officer, 24th Infantry Regiment, 25th Infantry Division. Colonel Champeny distinguished himself by extraordinary heroism in action against enemy aggressor forces near Haman, Korea, on 5 September 1950. Colonel Champeny came under direct attack by a numerically superior enemy force which had broken through the Regimental Sector. Confusion developed throughout the area and in the burning village where the Regimental Command Post was located. Small enemy groups had infiltrated the village. Colonel Champeny calmly directed and supervised the withdrawal of his depleted Regiment and the Regimental Command Post. When the new Regimental Command Post had been established, Colonel Champeny returned to reorganize battered elements of the Regiment. He came under fire and was wounded twice. Although severely wounded, he gave instructions for organizing the new defensive positions and transmitted the plans to Division Headquarters. His military poise and battle courage inspired the regiment to withstand the assault. Headquarters, Eighth U.S. Army, Korea: General Orders No. 127 (October 20, 1950)

As a result of his injuries, Champeny was evacuated to Japan and replaced as regimental commander by Colonel John T. Corley.

Bernice Champeny Cradler of Hartland, Wisconsin, Champeny's sister, told the Waukesha Daily Freeman in 1953 that the general had been offered command of the 24th Infantry Division when its commander, Major General William F. Dean, was captured by North Korean forces on August 25, 1950. Champeny reportedly did not accept the post as he was still in Japan recovering from his wounds.

In July 1951 Champeny was promoted to brigadier general and was assigned as Deputy Chief, Korean Military Advisory Group, under Major General Cornelius E. Ryan. In this role, Champeny was co-responsible for the transformation of the Republic of Korea Army (ROKA) into a fighting force capable of carrying its weight alongside the United States Eighth Army and made the Korean Military Advisory Group responsive to the needs of the Republic of Korea Army. He was also the senior advisor to the Replacement Training and Schools Command (RTSC), responsible for operations of the Replacement Training Command and the individual branch training facilities.

He was involved in gaining of the support in the restart of the pre-war program of sending Koreans to the United States for basic and advance infantry and artillery training. Champeny earned the support from the United States Army Infantry and Artillery Schools and eventually secured the support of the Army Assistant Chief of Staff for Operations, Lieutenant General Maxwell D. Taylor.

Unfortunately, Champeny had little influence in the final form of the ROKA's individual training programs because of personal disagreements with General Ryan and key members of his staff, which ultimately led to the loss of General James Van Fleet’s confidence and his relief and reduction in rank.

Champeny returned to the United States and retired in 1953 after 35 years on active duty. He and his wife retired to Oxford, Kansas.
