= St. Matthew's Episcopal Church (National City, California) =

Historic church in California, United States

- U.S. National Register of Historic Places
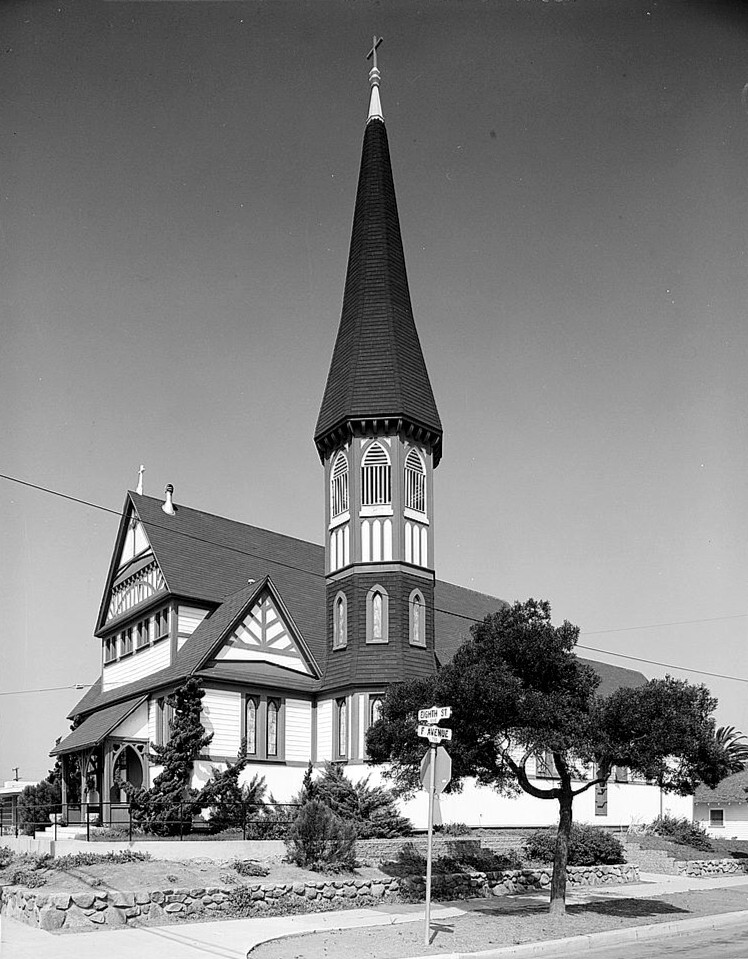

- Location within San Diego Location within San Diego County, California Location within California Location within the United States
- Location: 521 E. 8th St., National City, California
- Coordinates: 32°40′40″N 117°6′2″W
- Area: 0.4 acres (0.16 ha)
- Built: 1887
- Architect: William Herman
- Architectural style: Gothic Revival
- NRHP reference No.: 73000432
- Added to NRHP: October 25, 1973

St. Matthew's Episcopal Church is a historic church at 521 E. 8th Street in National City, California. It was built in 1887. It is an active congregation within the Episcopal Church and is part of the Diocese of San Diego.

== Design ==
It was designed by Chula Vista architect William Herman based on an initial design by Chula Vista resident "Mr. Crocker," who was inspired by a picture of a small church in the south of England. It was built in the Gothic Revival style with Tudor influences. The tall steeple was a landmark which could be seen for miles.

== History ==
An Episcopal Society for National City was formed on January 30, 1882; the secretary was Frank A. Kimball, founder of National City. On May 13, 1882, the society became St. Matthew's Parish Episcopal Church. It met in homes, and later in the Grange Hall, with worship led by priests from San Diego. Elizur Steele donated the land for the church, and Kimball and his brother donated a piece of property which was sold and the proceeds used to construct the building. The first worship service in the church was held on July 3, 1887, and services have been held regularly ever since. The church was consecrated on October 24, 1890.

== National Register ==
The church was added to the National Register of Historic Places in 1973.
