= Herbert B. Crosby =

United States Army general

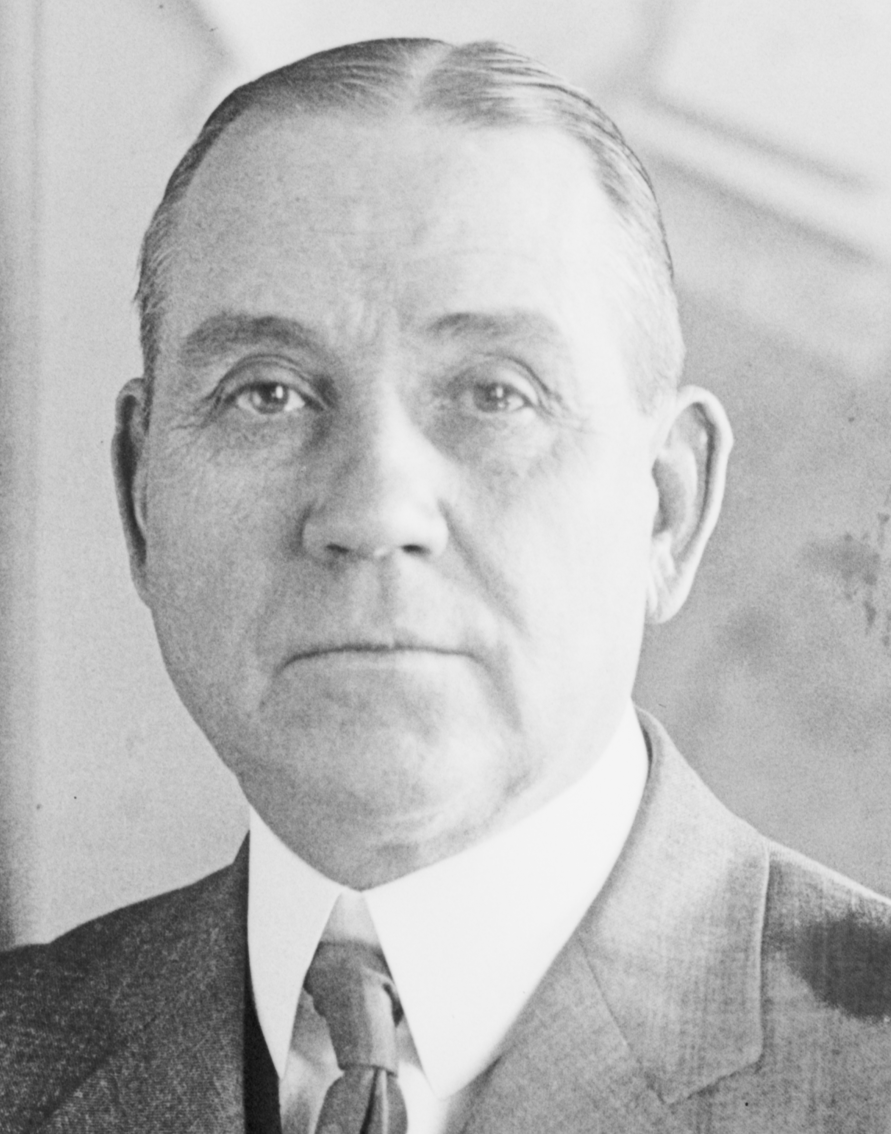
- Crosby as Chief of Cavalry in 1926
- Born: Herbert Ball Crosby; December 24, 1871; Basehor, Kansas
- Died: January 11, 1936 (aged 64); Washington, DC
- Burial place: Arlington National Cemetery
- Spouses: Catharine Adelaide Dakin (1877–1968) (m. 1902)

Commissioner of the District of Columbia
- In office April 10, 1930 – November 16, 1933
- Preceded by: Sidney F. Taliaferro
- Succeeded by: Melvin Colvin Hazen

Personal details
- Party: Democratic
- Military career
- Allegiance: United States of America
- Branch: United States Army
- Service years: 1893–1930
- Rank: Major General
- Unit: Cavalry Branch
- Commands: Fort Assinniboine, Montana; Troop B, 14th Cavalry Regiment; 351st Infantry Regiment; 176th Infantry Brigade, 88th Division; Chief of Cavalry
- Conflicts: Spanish–American War; Philippine–American War; Mexican Border Campaign; World War I

Herbert Ball Crosby (December 24, 1871 – January 11, 1936) was a career officer in the United States Army. A veteran of the Spanish–American War and World War I, he attained the rank of major general as the Army's Chief of Cavalry.

Born in Kansas and raised in Kansas and Illinois, Crosby graduated from West Point in 1893 and was commissioned as a second lieutenant of Cavalry. He served throughout the western United States at the start of his career, and served in Cuba during the Spanish–American War. As his career progressed, Crosby served in the Philippines during the Philippine–American War and in Arizona during the Mexican Border Campaign. During World War I, Crosby commanded the 351st Infantry Regiment, a unit of the 88th Division, and served on several occasions as acting commander of the division's 176th Infantry Brigade.

After the war, Crosby graduated from the Army's School of the Line, Command and General Staff College, and Army War College; he was an instructor at the Staff College after his graduation, and after he graduated from the War College he served as its deputy commandant. In 1926, Crosby was appointed as the Army's Chief of Cavalry, and he served until retiring in 1930.

From 1930 to 1933, Crosby was one of the three federal commissioners responsible for administering the government of Washington, DC. He died in Washington in 1936, and was buried at Arlington National Cemetery.

== Early life ==
Herbert Ball Crosby was born in Basehor, Kansas on December 24, 1871, the son of George Heman and Jane (Ball) Crosby. He was raised and educated in Leavenworth, Kansas and Chicago, Illinois, and graduated from the United States Military Academy in 1893. Crosby was commissioned as a second lieutenant of Cavalry, and assigned to the 8th Cavalry Regiment.

== Start of career ==
Crosby served with 8th Cavalry Regiment from 1893 to 1901, including postings to Fort Meade (South Dakota), Fort Yates (North Dakota), Fort Assinniboine (Montana) (including service as post commander), and Huntsville, Alabama. During the Spanish–American War he served with his regiment at Puerto Principe, Cuba.

In 1901, Crosby was promoted to captain and assigned to the 14th Cavalry Regiment. His assignments included command of Troop B and regimental commissary, and he served at Fort Riley (Kansas), Fort Huachuca (Arizona), the Philippines, Fort Walla Walla (Washington), and Boise Barracks (Idaho). From 1909 to 1911 he performed recruiting duty at Fort Slocum, New York, and from 1912 to 1915, Crosby served in the Philippines with the 8th Cavalry. In 1915 he was assigned to the 1st Cavalry Regiment, and he served at the Presidio of San Francisco and the Presidio of Monterey, and then at Fort Naco, Arizona as part of the Mexican Border Campaign. He was promoted to major in 1916.

== World War I ==
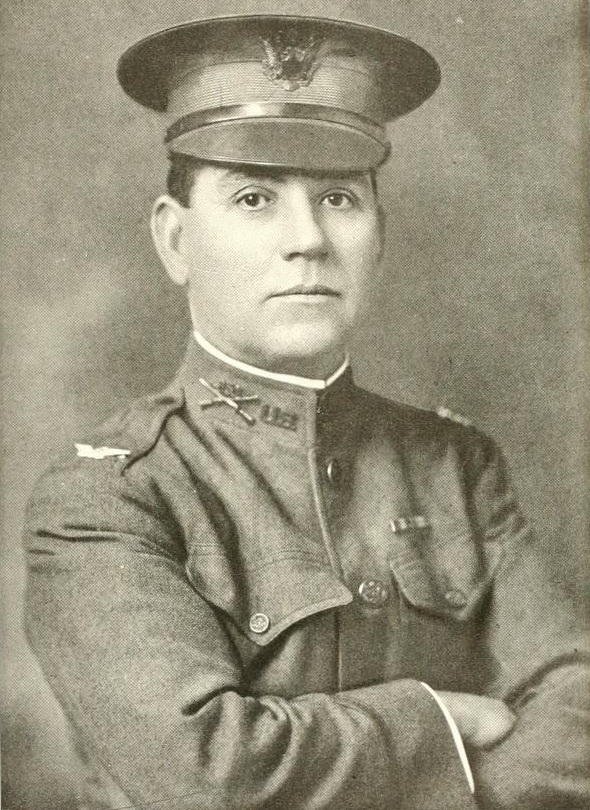
Crosby as commander of the 351st Infantry during World War I

Crosby was promoted to temporary lieutenant colonel in June 1917, and temporary colonel the following August. From 1917 to 1919 he commanded the 351st Infantry Regiment, a unit of 176th Infantry Brigade, 88th Division. The regiment was composed of soldiers from Minnesota and Iowa, and Crosby commanded it from its organization at Camp Dodge, Iowa through its combat in France. He also acted as commander of the 176th Infantry Brigade from April to May and July to September 1918, in January 1919, and from April to May 1919.

== Post-World War I ==
In 1919, Crosby reverted to his permanent rank of lieutenant colonel. He attended the School of the Line as a student from 1919 to 1920, and was promoted to permanent colonel in 1920. From 1920 to 1921 he was a student at the Command and General Staff College, and he remained there as an instructor following his graduation. He was a student at the Army War College from 1922 to 1923, and he remained at the War College as assistant commandant until 1926.

== Chief of Cavalry ==
Crosby was appointed as Chief of Cavalry in 1926, succeeding Malin Craig, and was promoted to major general. He served until 1930, and his tenure was notable for his advocacy of modernization. Unlike many traditional Cavalry members, who continued to promote the use of horses for cavalry, Crosby pushed for experimentation and exercises that included airplanes and tanks as part of the Army's Cavalry divisions. Crosby retired in 1930 and was succeeded by Guy V. Henry Jr.

== Later career ==
From 1930 to 1933, Crosby was one of the three federal commissioners responsible for administering the government of Washington, DC.

== Death and burial ==
Crosby died in Washington, DC on January 11, 1936. He was buried at Arlington National Cemetery, Section 6, Site 5013.

== Family ==
In 1902, Crosby married Catharine Adelaide Dakin of Evanston, Illinois. They were the parents of four children—George Dakin, Richard Lansing, Jane, and Gordon Willard.

== Sources ==
=== Books ===
- Brantner, C. F. (1919). 351st Infantry: First Call, 1917. St. Paul, MN: 351st Regimental Association.
- Center of Military History (1988). Order of Battle of the United States Land Forces in the World War (PDF). Vol. 2. Washington, DC: United States Army. Archived from the original (PDF) on September 24, 2015.
- Cullum, George Washington; Holden, Edward Singleton (1901). Biographical Register of the Officers and Graduates of the U.S. Military Academy at West Point. Vol. Supplement, IV–A. Cambridge, MA: Cambridge Press.
- Cullum, George Washington; Braden, Charles (1910). Biographical Register of the Officers and Graduates of the U.S. Military Academy at West Point. Vol. V. Saginaw, MI: Seemann & Peters.
- Cullum, George Washington; Robinson, Wirt (1920). Biographical Register of the Officers and Graduates of the U.S. Military Academy at West Point. Vol. Supplement, Volume VI-A. Saginaw, MI: Seemann & Peters.
- Green, Constance McLaughlin (1962). Washington: A History of the Capital, 1800-1950. Princeton, NJ: Princeton University Press. ISBN 978-0-691-61675-9.
- Jeffers, Harry Paul (2008). Command of Honor: General Lucian Truscott's Path to Victory in World War II. New York, NY: Penguin Books. ISBN 978-0-451-22402-6.
- United States Military Academy Association of Graduates (1936). Annual Report of the Association of Graduates. West Point, NY: United States Military Academy.

=== Newspapers ===
- "The Army: Cavalry, Artillery and Infantry; 8th Cavalry". Army and Navy Journal. New York, NY: W. C. & F. P. Church. June 11, 1898.
- "The 14th Cavalry Addition". Junction City Weekly Union. Junction City, KS. May 3, 1901 – via Newspapers.com.
- "General Crosby Unruffled By Capital 'Cossack Rule' Cry". Baltimore Sun. Baltimore, MD. February 8, 1930 – via Newspapers.com.
- "Maj. Gen. H. B. Crosby Died In Reed Hospital". Indianapolis Star. Indianapolis, IN. Associated Press. January 12, 1936 – via Newspapers.com.

== External sources ==
- "Crosby Herbert B." arlingtoncemetery.mil/. Arlington, VA: Headquarters, Department of the Army. Archived from the original on August 5, 2019.
- "Retirement of General Crosby" (PDF). The Cavalry Journal. Washington, DC: United States Cavalry Association. April 1930. p. 167. Archived from the original (PDF) on 2017-01-25.
