= Briggsville, Wisconsin =

Census-designated place in Wisconsin, United States

- Census-designated place
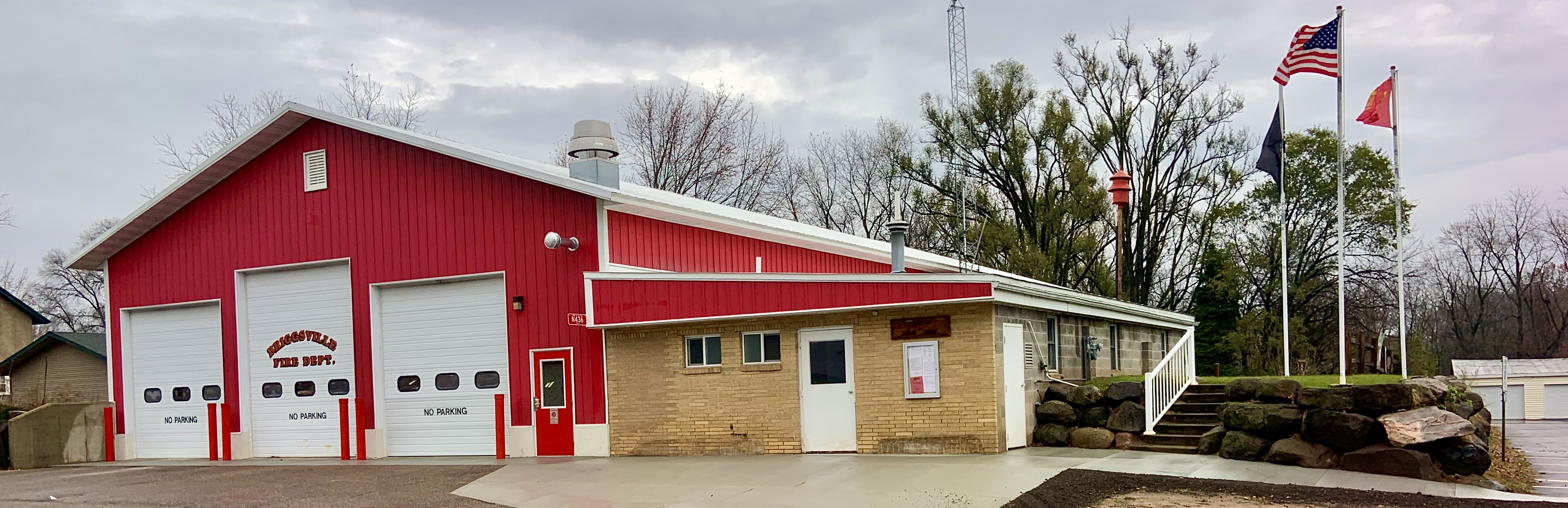
- Douglas Town Hall in Briggsville

- Location within Wisconsin Location within the United States
- Coordinates: 43°39′18″N 89°35′07″W
- Country: United States
- State: Wisconsin
- County: Marquette

Area
  - Total: 1.928 sq mi (4.99 km^{2})
  - Land: 1.579 sq mi (4.09 km^{2})
  - Water: 0.349 sq mi (0.90 km^{2})
- Elevation: 807 ft (246 m)

Population (2020)
  - Total: 316
  - Density: 163.9/sq mi (63.3/km^{2})
- Time zone: UTC-6 (Central (CST))
  - Summer (DST): UTC-5 (CDT)
- Area code: 608
- GNIS feature ID: 1562201

Briggsville is a census-designated place in the southwestern corner of Marquette County, Wisconsin, United States. It is located on Wisconsin Highway 23 in the town of Douglas. It uses ZIP code 53920.

As of the 2020 census, Briggsville had a population of 316.

Briggsville is the home of the National Shrine of Saint Philomena.

== Geography ==
Briggsville is located on the eastern side of Mason Lake. The Bonnie Oaks Historic District is a little over a mile to the east.

== Education ==
It is in the Wisconsin Dells School District.

== Notable people ==
- Arthur S. Champeny, United States Army officer
- Frank J. Kimball, legislator
- Margery Latimer, writer
- Willam Murphy, legislator

== Gallery ==
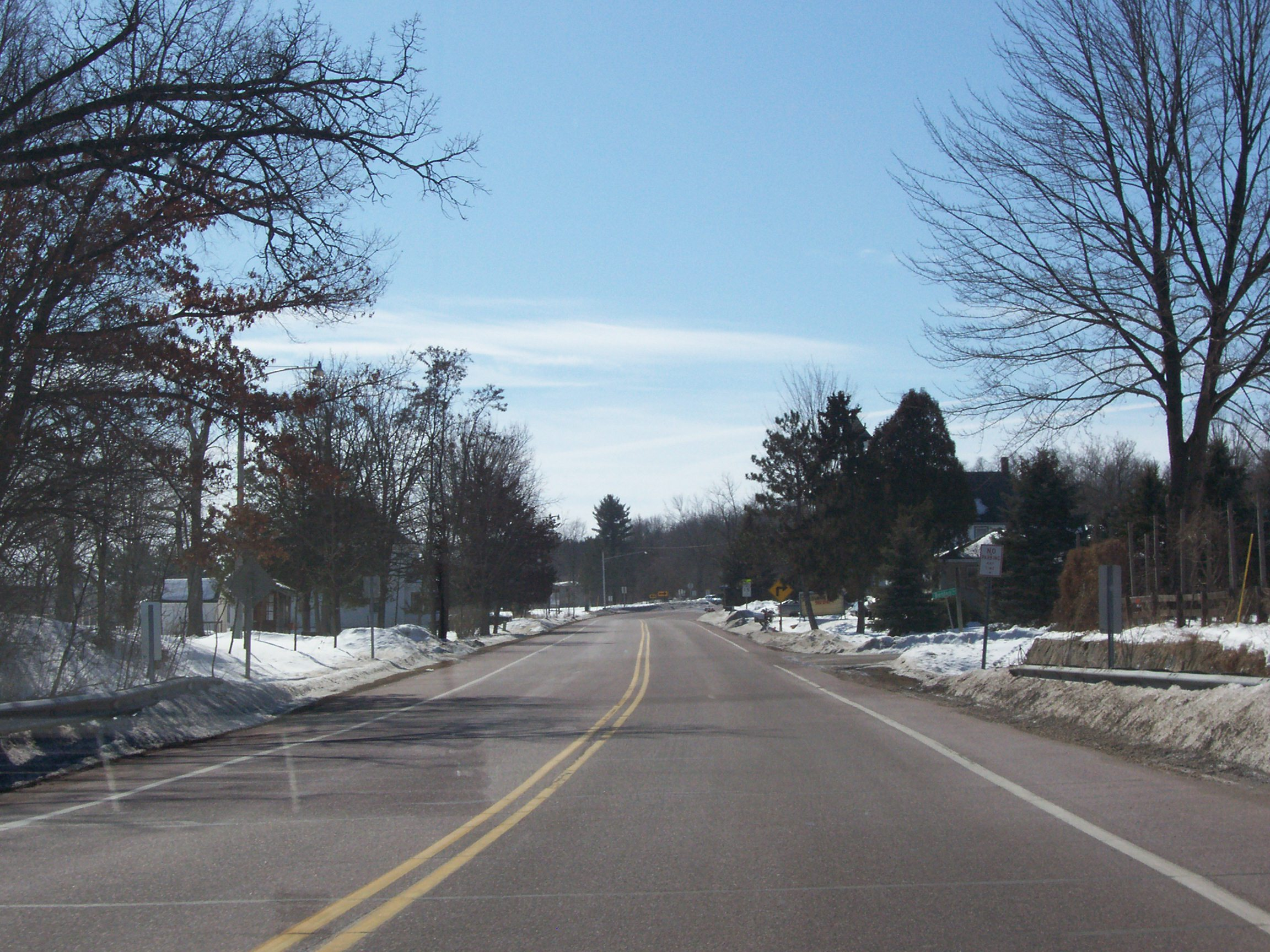
Looking at Briggsville on Highway 23

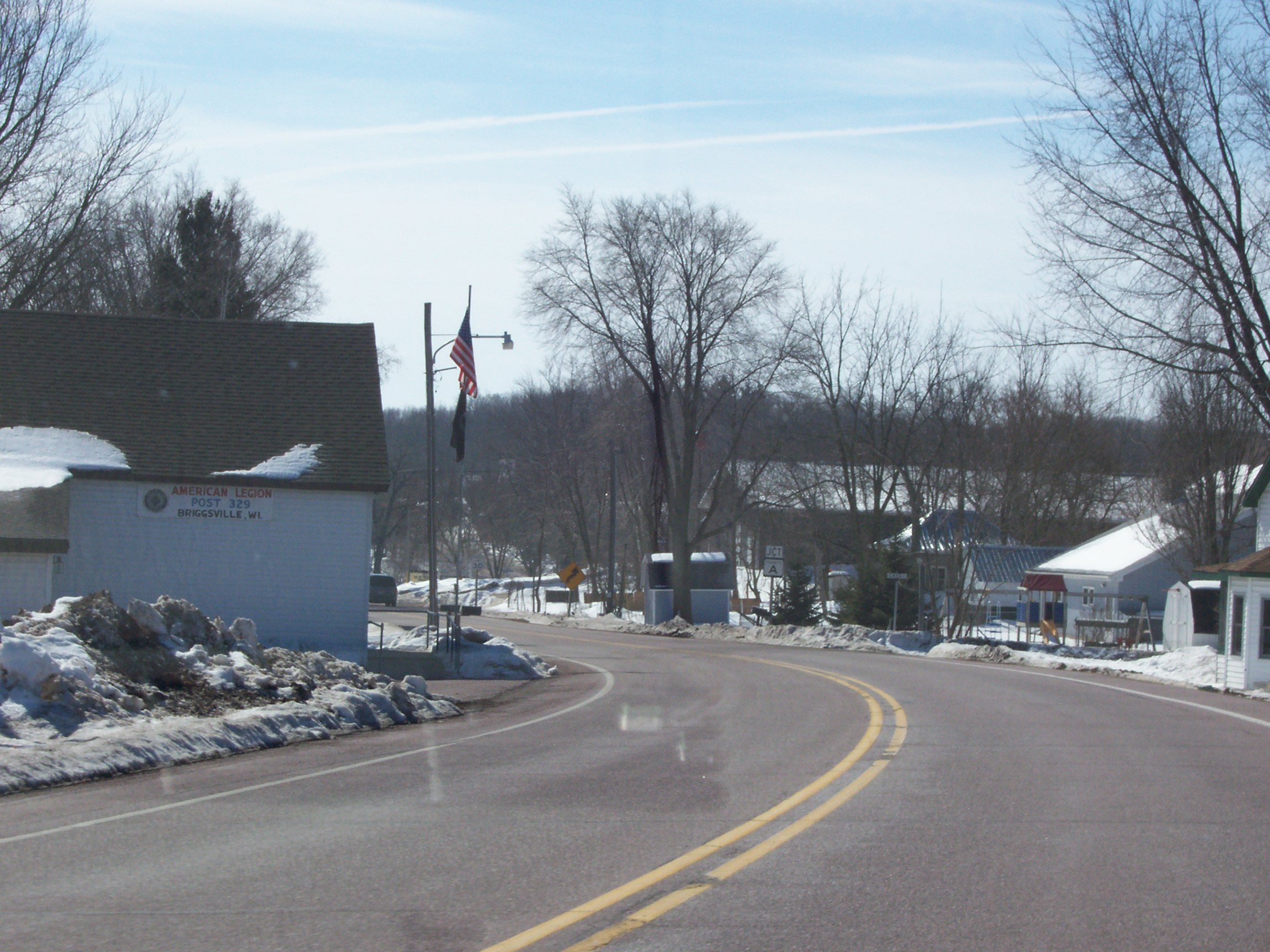
Looking at Briggsville on Highway 23
