= Frank A. Kimball =

American businessman (1832–1913)

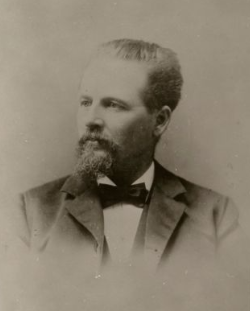
- Kimball, c. 1897
- Born: Francis Augustus Kimball; January 26, 1832; Hopkinton, New Hampshire, U.S.
- Died: August 11, 1913 (aged 81); National City, California, U.S.
- Resting place: La Vista Memorial Park, National City, California, U.S.
- Occupations: Businessman, horticulturalist
- Spouse: Sarah Kimball (m. 1857)

Francis Augustus Kimball (January 26, 1832 – August 11, 1913) was an American businessman and horticulturalist. He is often associated with bringing the railroad to San Diego Bay, though he was also a prominent horticulturist and businessman, involved in developing the Mission olive industry. He helped promote new entrepreneurs and philanthropically donated land for cemeteries, schools, and churches. He was generally associated with the founding and continued success of National City, California.

== Early life and career before California ==
Kimball was born in Hopkinton, New Hampshire, on January 26, 1832. His parents were Asa Kimball (Note: Asa served in the New Hampshire Militia with the 40th regiment.) and Hanna Little. He began his career as a businessman when he opened a merchandise store. However, with the Panic of 1857, he fell into debt, which drove him to take out a loan and travel westward.

== Life in California ==
=== San Francisco Bay Area ===
In 1861, Kimball moved to San Francisco. In December 1862, Kimball's wife came to San Francisco aboard the Orizaba. In San Francisco, Kimball and his brothers began carpentry work, and were able to send money back to New Hampshire to pay off his debts there. Operating in Oakland as Kimball Brothers, they later moved to southern California, to the area that would become National City. Frank's brother, Levi Kimball, became a partner of Kimball Brothers briefly in National City, then returned to Oakland with his wife. In 1867, Frank Kimball was diagnosed with a lung disease and told to relocate to a place with a warmer and drier climate.

=== National City ===
==== Arrival in San Diego ====
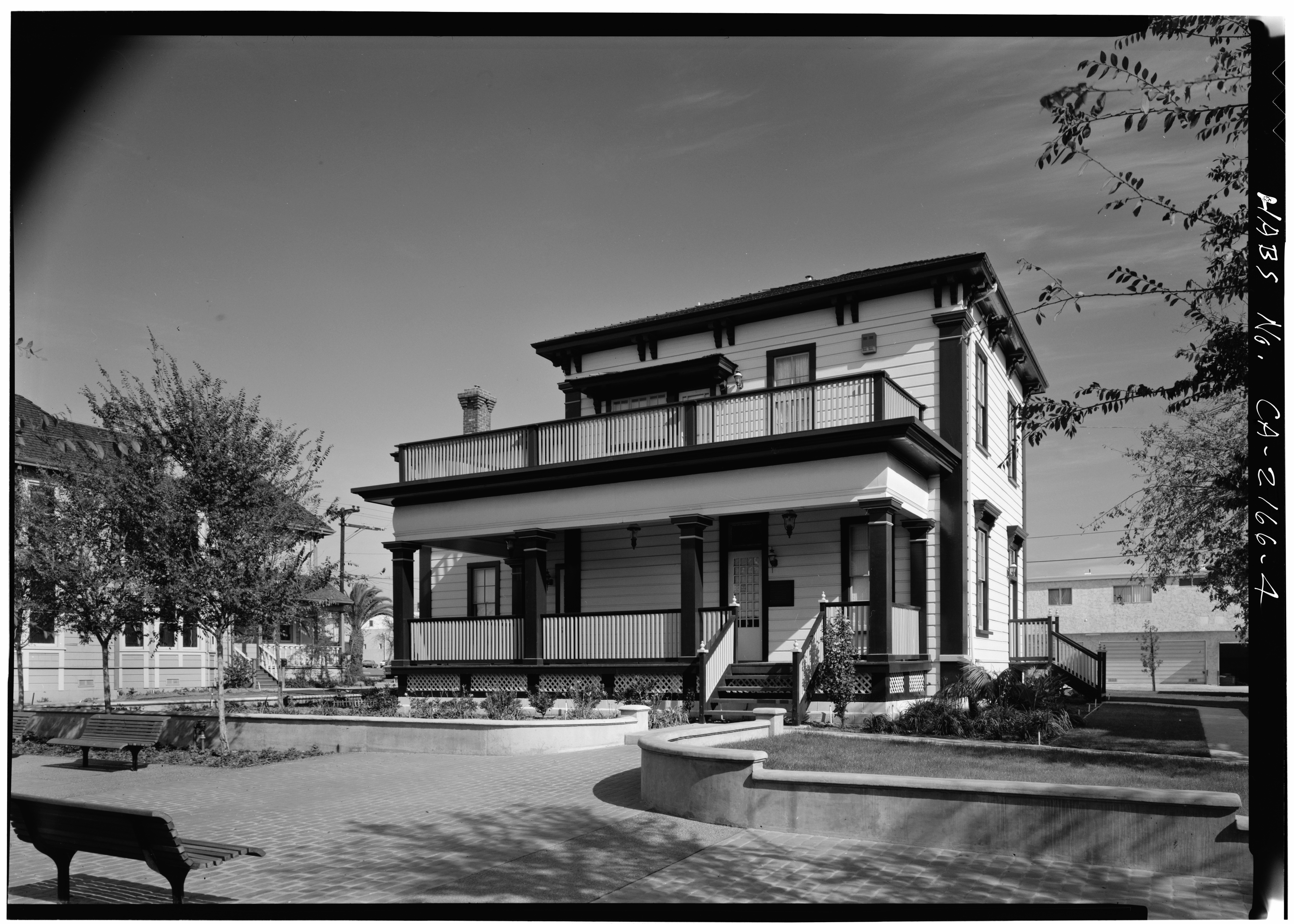
Frank Kimball House

Kimball arrived in San Diego, California, on June 1, 1868. He had purchased the Rancho de la Nación on June 15 for $30,000, but due to an error on the deed the sale from François Louis Pioche was only finalized on June 18. At the time of purchase, no one resided on the lands of the rancho. (Note: Prior to Spanish colonization of California in the late 1700s, the Kumeyaay people lived in the area. In the 18th century it had previously been used as cattle grazing land by the Spanish, then the Mexicans. After the Mexican-American War, it changed hands several times before eventually being sold to the Kimball Brothers.) The Kimball House was built in August-September 1868 and became the first house in National City. That same year Kimball had a hand in the founding of the San Diego Union newspaper.

==== Building National City ====
As the new owner of the Rancho de la Nación parcel, Kimball's home was the first house in National City. (Note: It is claimed to be the first house built in the area between San Diego and the Mexico-United States Border.) In 1869, Frank, along with his brother Warren, established the Kimball Brothers Water Company. (Note: This company had all riparian water rights and rights to the waters of the Sweetwater River. These rights were later transferred to teh San Diego Land and Town Company. That company went on to construct the Sweetwater Dam.) Frank Kimball's sister Mary was married to Fred Copeland, who was a civil engineer. Mary and Fred moved to National City in 1869 and Fred eventually was National City's City Engineer and Surveyor, and later as Deputy Surveyor and Deputy Assessor for San Diego County. He had the final say for the layout of the city streets. In 1870, shortly after their arrival, one of the first settlers, Mrs. Wincapaw passed away. Kimball established La Vista Memorial Park as a community cemetery. A later aerial view of the park found that the foliage had been planted in what appears to be the shape of a harp. In 1871, Kimball funded the building of a wharf into San Diego Bay. In 1875, he partially funded construction of a road from National City, via Jamul, to Fort Yuma.

==== Agricultural industry ====
Kimball promoted fruit cultivation in National City, which led others to plant fruit elsewhere in San Diego County. In 1869, Kimball received Mission olive tree cuttings from Mission San Diego de Alcalá in the San Diego River valley. By 1872, his cuttings had begun to bloom. He would later get Mission olive tree cuttings from Mission San Luis Rey de Francia and Las Flores Estancia. In 1873, Kimball began to raise sheep. In 1876, he planted the first eucalyptus in San Diego County. In 1879, Kimball received French olive trees from the government, and planted them. He also grew grapes and citrus crops, including a variety of lemon which he developed, known as the Agnes. Another orchard which Kimball grew was White Pearmain, an apple cultivar, which originated from a sapling from New Hampshire. In addition to the White Pearmain orchard, Kimball grew Ben Davis apples.

In 1880, Kimball was among those who helped organize the first San Diego County Fair. He would eventually grow more foreign olive cultivars, including the Cornicabra. By 1883, Kimball's olive grove was 5,000 trees strong. In 1884, he traveled to Philadelphia, and in 1885 to New Orleans, to advertise his productive horticulture business. At the end of 1886, an olive oil mill was constructed; oil from Kimball's mill competed with the olive oil produced by Elwood Cooper of Santa Barbara, who had previously been the only domestic olive oil producer in the nation.

==== Expanding into railways ====
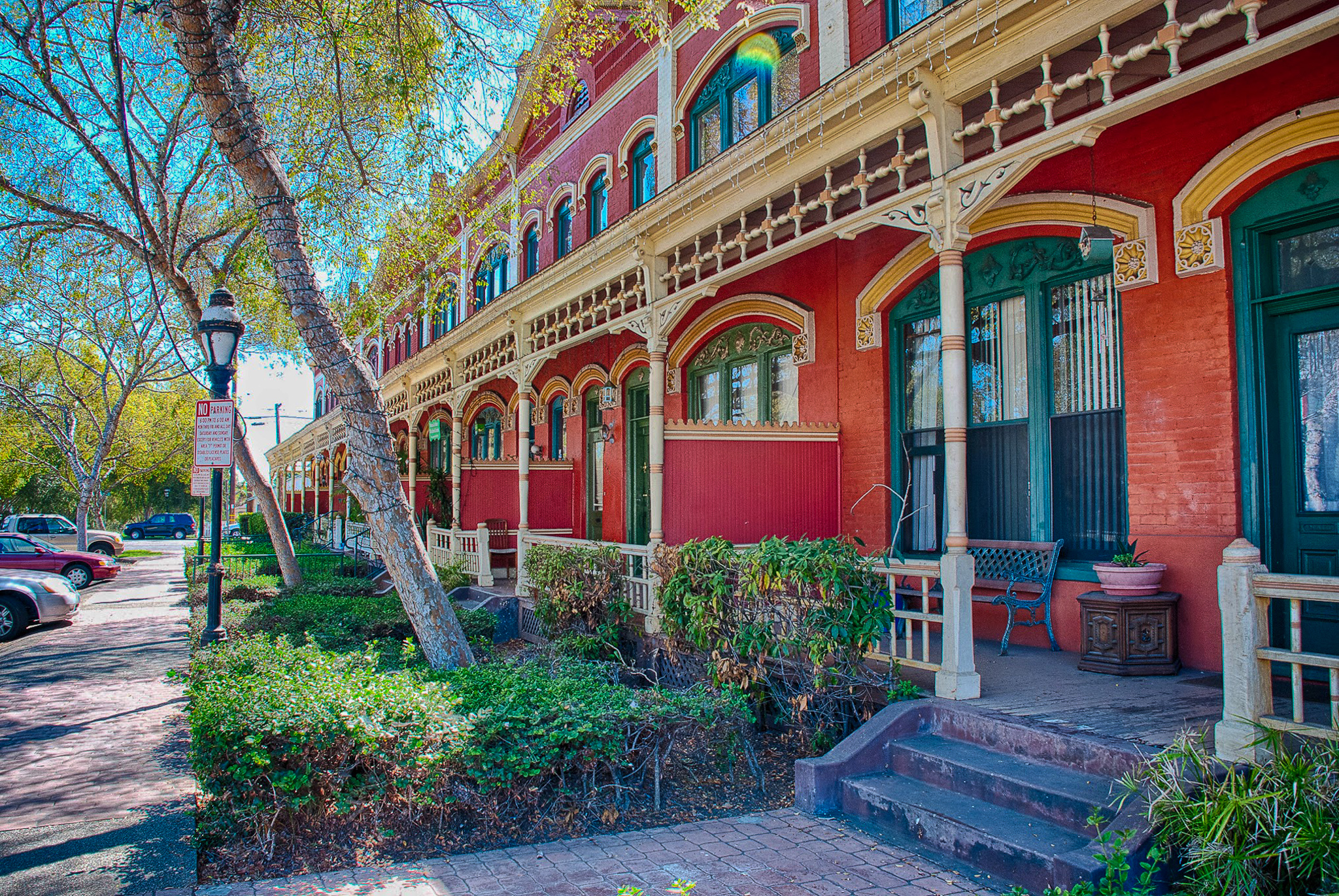
Brick Row, A Avenue between 9th and 10th Streets, National City

In 1870, Kimball attempted to lure the Texas and Pacific Railway into building a Pacific terminus (final stop) for their transcontinental railroad in National City, without success; this failure was partly due to the efforts of the Central Pacific Railroad. A decade later, in 1880, Kimball traveled to Boston and was able to secure a deal with the Atchison, Topeka and Santa Fe Railway to build a transcontinental rail terminus in National City in exchange for him giving the railroad 16,000 acres (65 km^{2}). To accomplish this goal, the railway established the California Southern Railroad as a subsidiary. In 1887, Kimball funded the building of the Brick Row to house individuals connected to the Santa Fe Railway. As a result of this, the railroad funded the construction of Sweetwater Dam in 1888, which secured Kimball and the rest of National City a reliable water source.

==== Other ventures ====
In 1880, the Kimball brothers purchased half of Rancho Janal. In 1887, Kimball purchased the portion of Rancho Janal owned by his brother Warren. His Rancho Janal holdings were lost along with his other property.

In 1889, Kimball wrote a family history of José Antonio Estudillo. That same year Kimball was appointed commissioner of the State Board of Horticulture; in that role he lobbied for the passage of the Pure Food and Drug Act. Also in 1889, Kimball invested in the creation of the Otay Watch Company; when its factory was completed in Otay (now in Chula Vista) it was the only watch manufacturer in the United States west of the Mississippi River. In April 1891, at their Victorian-style home, Kimball and his wife hosted the presidential party of President Benjamin Harrison, which included Secretary Jeremiah M. Rusk and Ulysses S. Grant Jr. In 1893, Kimball received a bronze medal for his olive oil exhibit at the World's Columbian Exposition in Chicago; at the exposition he also displayed pickled and dried olives.

==== Falling into debt ====
At one point, Kimball was considered the wealthiest man in all of San Diego County. In 1893, he fell into debt again. In 1894 all his property, and remaining debt, were purchased by Ralph Granger. Still civically minded, Kimball and his brother Warren helped found the public library of National City, through their donation of 750 books from their personal collections. In 1901, Kimball's holdings in the Otay Watch Company were sold, and the watch company's equipment was shipped to Japan. In 1904, he was paid to travel to the Louisiana Purchase Exposition, where he hosted an exhibit on the agriculture of San Diego. By 1905, he had financially recovered and returned to selling olive oil and pickled olives. He also shipped the first oranges from National City.

== Personal life ==
Kimball became a Mason when he joined a lodge in New Hampshire.

On April 19, 1857, he married Sarah Currier. They had no children. He had three brothers, George Little Kimball, Levi Woodbury Kimball, and Warren Carlton Kimball.

In 1882, Kimball joined the congregation of St. Matthew's Episcopal Church in National City; he donated the land the church was built upon. Kimball was also a founding member of the South West Masonic Lodge No. 283 in National City. He was elected chairman at its first meeting on September 15, 1886. His nephew, Augustus B. Kimball, son of Frank's brother George, was also involved in the lodge. On August 11, 1913, Frank A. Kimball died and on August 13, was buried at La Vista Memorial Park on the outskirts of National City, alongside many other members of the Kimball family.

== Legacy ==
Frank Kimball has been described as "the founder of National City". The city's continued existence is in large part a result of his efforts. The central park for National City is named for Kimball. In addition his importation of flora from outside of the United States has had a lasting impact on horticulture.
