= White Winter Pearmain =

Apple cultivar

Malus domestica 'White Winter Pearmain'
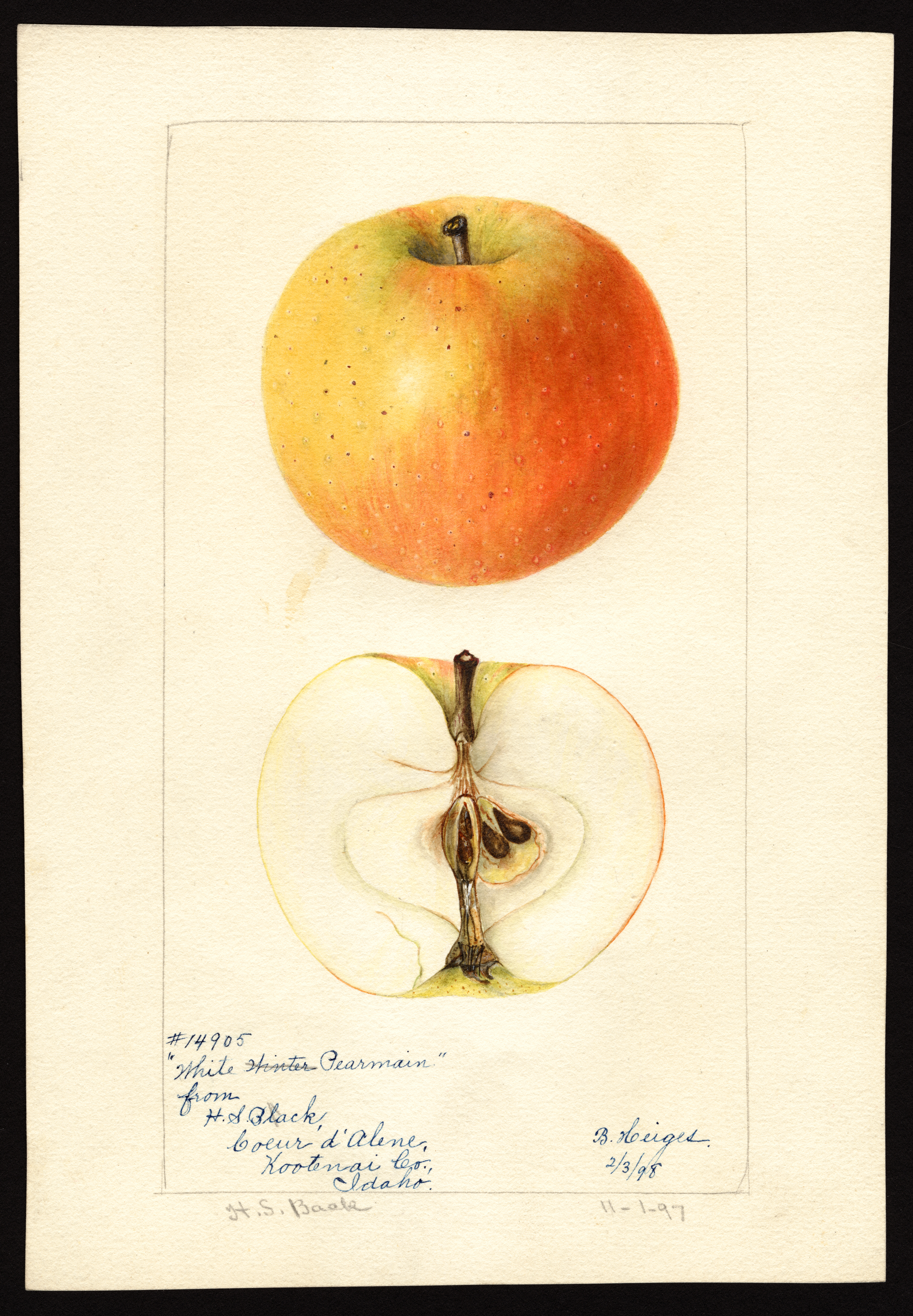
- Cultivar: 'White Winter Pearmain'

The 'White Winter Pearmain' apple cultivar, also known as 'White Pearmain' and 'Cambellite', is a dessert apple that has been known since before 1850.
