= 351st Infantry Regiment =

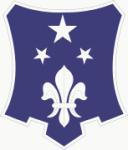
- Regimental Distinctive Unit Insignia
- Active: 1917–1919; 1921–1945; 1946–present
- Country: USA
- Branch: U.S. Army
- Role: Infantry
- Size: Regiment
- Part of: First Army
- Motto: TOUJOURS PRÊT (Always Ready)
- Colors: Blue and Silver
- Anniversaries: Constituted 5 August 1917 in the National Army
- Decorations: Croix de Guerre, Army Superior Unit Award
- Battle honours: World War I World War II

Commanders
- Notable commanders: William W. Eagles; Arthur S. Champeny; Numa A. Watson; Paul W. Caraway; Earle G. Wheeler

The 351st Infantry Regiment is a United States Army infantry regiment first organized in the National Army for service in World War I as part of the 88th Division in Europe. During the interwar period, it was reconstituted in the Organized Reserve with the 88th Division and later served in the Mediterranean Theater during World War II. Since then, it has served as a training regiment, training Army Reserve and Army National Guard soldiers for service overseas after the September 11 terrorist attacks.

== Service history ==
=== World War I ===
The regiment was constituted 5 August 1917 in the National Army as the 351st Infantry and assigned to the 176th Infantry Brigade of the 88th Division. It was organized at Camp Dodge, Iowa on 30 August 1917, and Herbert B. Crosby was named to command it. In August 1917, the regiment was organized with 3,755 officers and enlisted men:

- Headquarters & Headquarters Company- 303
  - Supply Company- 140
  - Machine Gun Company- 178
  - Medical & Chaplain Detachment- 56
- Infantry Battalion (x3)- 1,026
  - Headquarters- 2
  - Rifle Company (x4)- 256

The doughboys of the regiment deployed to France as part of the American Expeditionary Forces . After completing its war service in France it demobilized at Camp Dodge on 7 June 1919.

=== Interwar period ===
Pursuant to the National Defense Act of 1920, the 351st Infantry was reconstituted in the Organized Reserve on 24 June 1921, assigned to the 88th Division, and allotted to the Seventh Corps Area, which placed the regiment in the state of Minnesota. The regiment was initiated (activated) on 12 October 1921 with the regimental headquarters at St. Paul, Minnesota. Subordinate battalion headquarters were concurrently organized as follows: 1st Battalion at St. Paul; 2nd Battalion at Austin, Minnesota; and the 3rd Battalion at Willmar, Minnesota. The regiment typically conducted inactive training period meetings at the National Guard armory in St. Paul and at the American Legion Club in Austin. Summer training was held most years with the 7th Division's 3rd Infantry Regiment at Fort Snelling, Minnesota. Infantry Citizens' Military Training Camps were also supervised some years at Fort Snelling as an alternate form of summer training. The primary ROTC "feeder" school for new Reserve lieutenants for the regiment was the University of Minnesota in Minneapolis. The regiment was inactivated on 22 January 1942 by relief of remaining Reserve personnel.

=== World War II ===
The regiment was ordered into active military service 15 July 1942 and reorganized at Camp Gruber, Oklahoma using a cadre provided by the 9th Infantry Division. The regiment participated in the Louisiana Maneuvers in June through August 1943. The regiment departed Camp Patrick Henry on 4 November 1943 through the Hampton Roads Port of Embarkation as Shipment 8629-H. In July 1943, the regiment was organized with 3,256 officers and enlisted men:

- Headquarters & Headquarters Company- 111
  - Service Company- 114
  - Anti-Tank Company- 165
  - Cannon Company- 118
  - Medical Detachment- 135
- Infantry Battalion (x3)- 871
  - Headquarters & Headquarters Company- 126
  - Rifle Company (x3)- 193
  - Weapons Company- 156
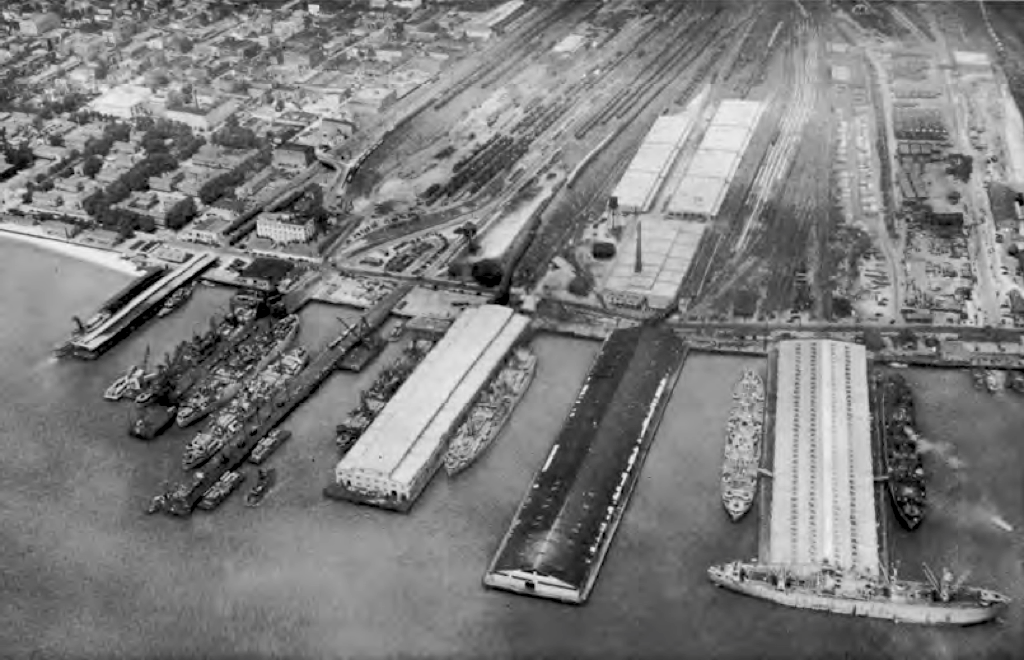
Hampton Roads Port of Embarkation

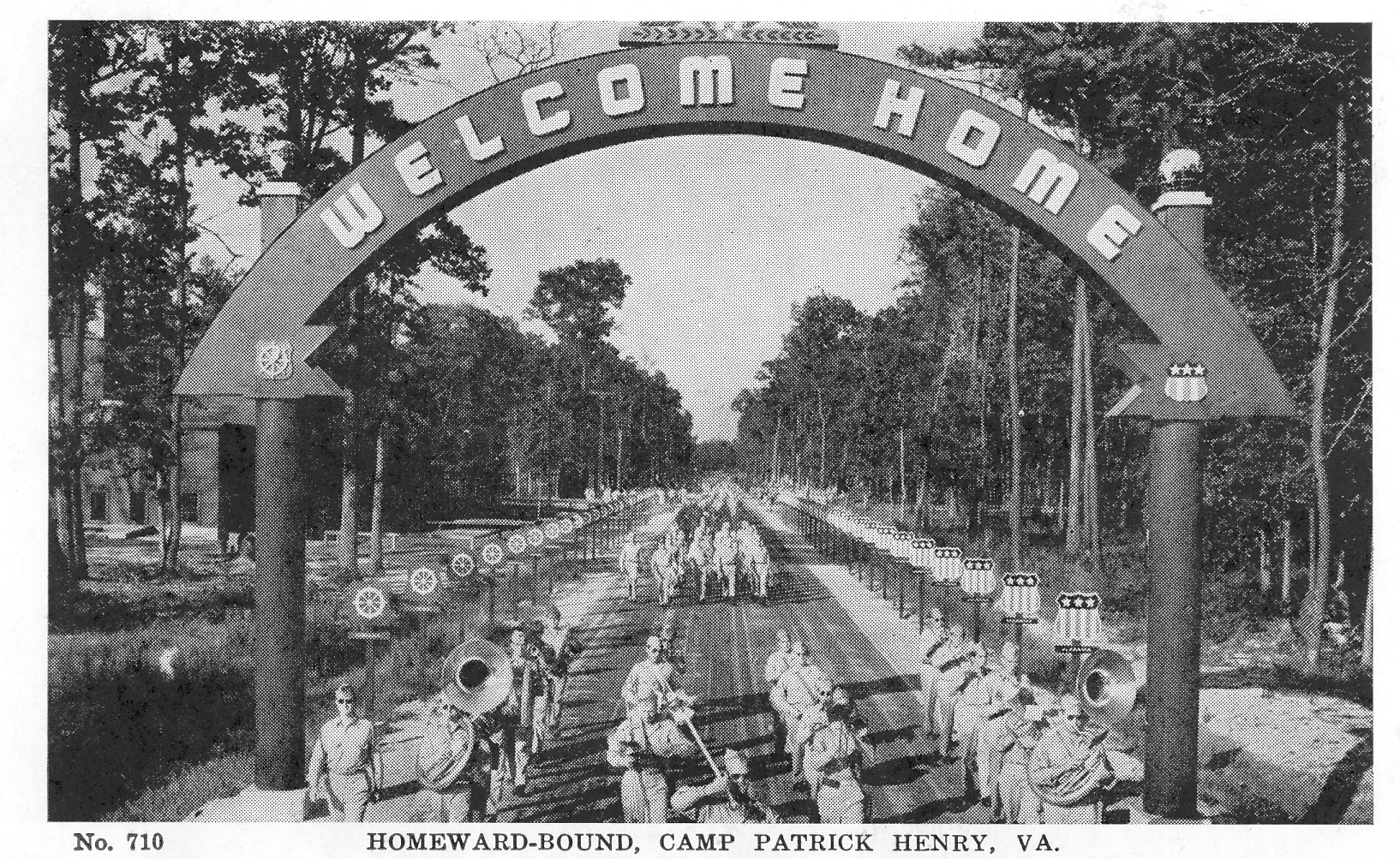
Welcome Home, Camp Patrick Henry

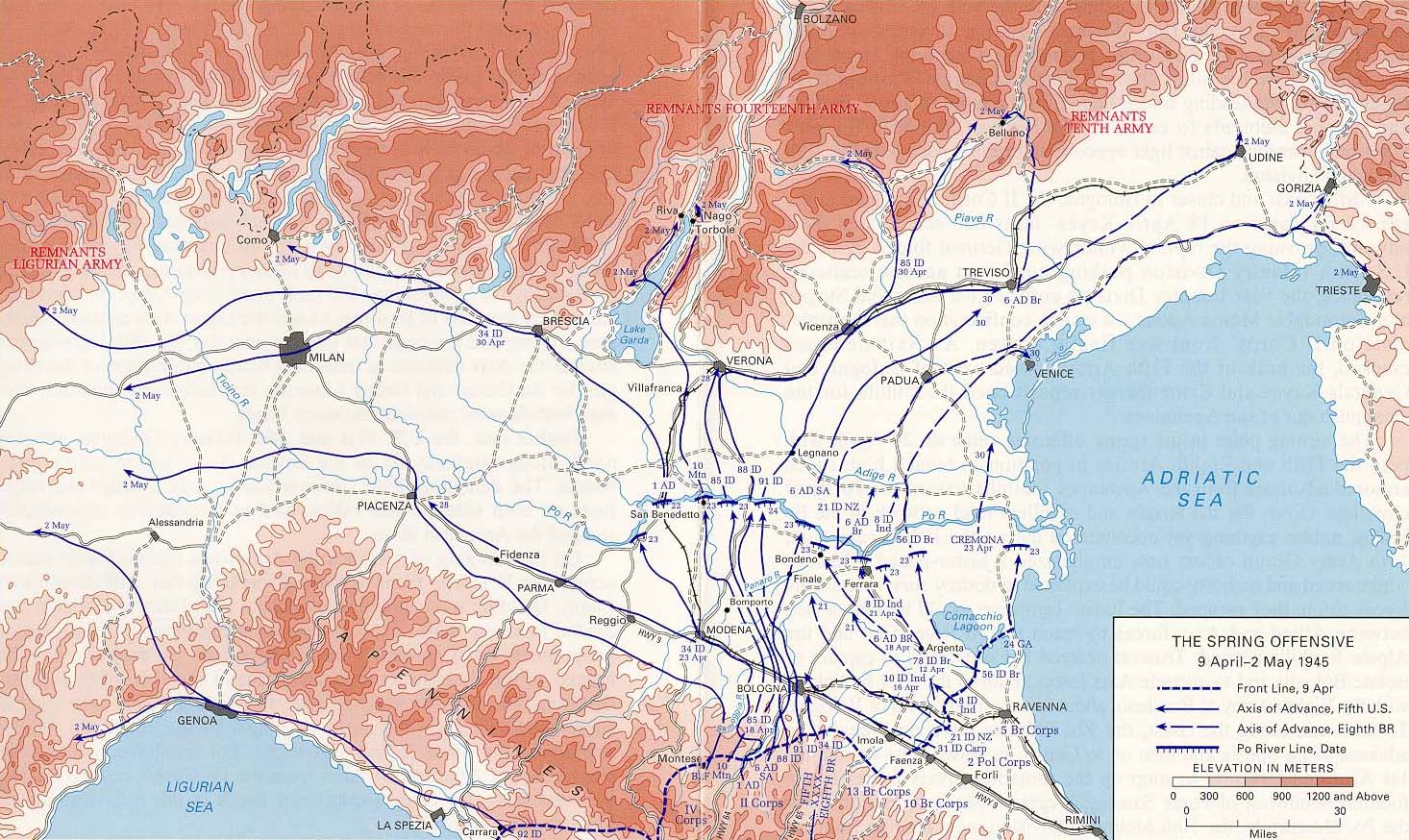
Spring Offensive, Italy 1945

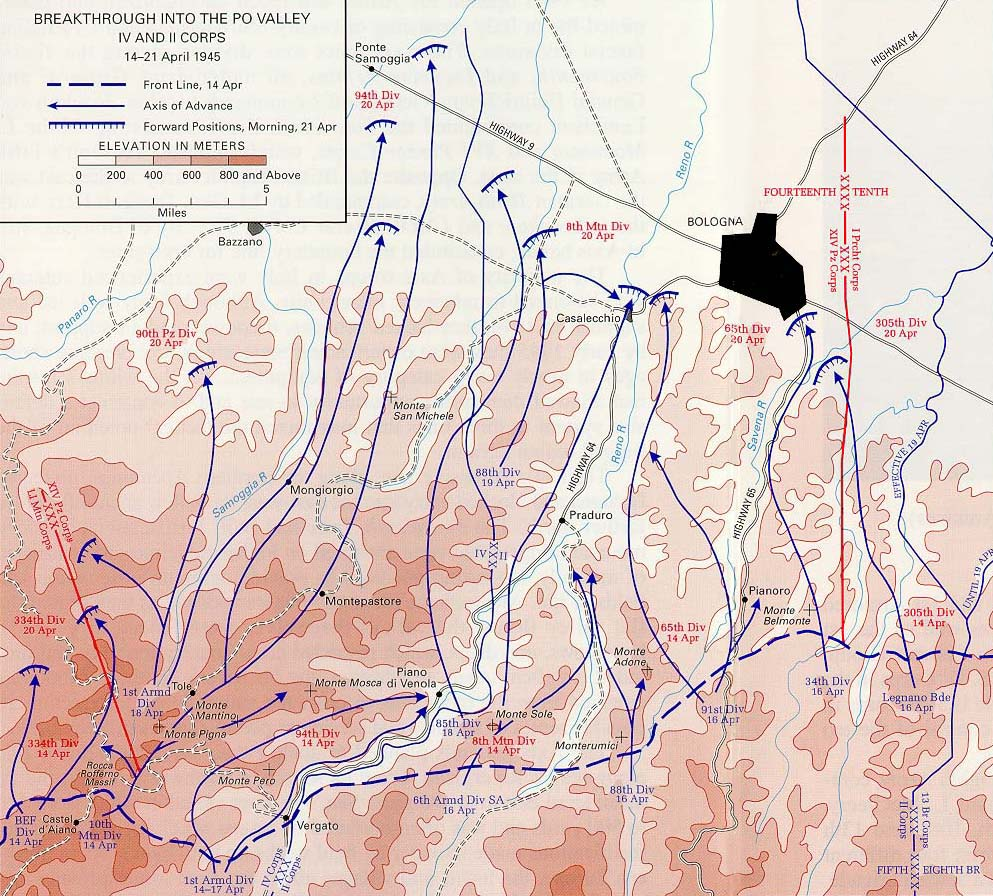
IV Corps operations, Italy April 1945

=== Trieste United States Troops ===
The 351st Infantry was relieved from assignment to the 88th Infantry Division on 1 May 1947 and served as temporary military Government of the Free Territory of Trieste, securing the new independent State between Italy and Yugoslavia on behalf of the United Nations Security Council. Designated TRUST (Trieste United States Troops), the command served as the front line in the Cold War from 1947 to 1954, including confrontations with Yugoslavian forces. In October 1954 the mission ended upon the signing of the Memorandum of Understanding of London establishing a temporary civil administration in the Anglo-American Zone of the Free Territory of Trieste, entrusted to the responsibility of the Italian Government. TRUST units, which included a number of 88th divisional support units, all bore a unit patch which was the coat of arms of the Free Territory of Trieste superimposed over the divisional quatrefoil, over which was a blue scroll containing the designation "TRUST" in white. The 1948 organization of the regiment called for a strength of 3,774 officers and enlisted men organized as below:

- Headquarters & Headquarters Company- 289
  - Service Company- 186
  - Tank Company- 148
  - Heavy Mortar Company- 190
  - Medical Company- 214
- Infantry Battalion (x3)
  - Headquarters & Headquarters Company- 119
  - Rifle Company (x3)- 211
  - Weapons Company- 165
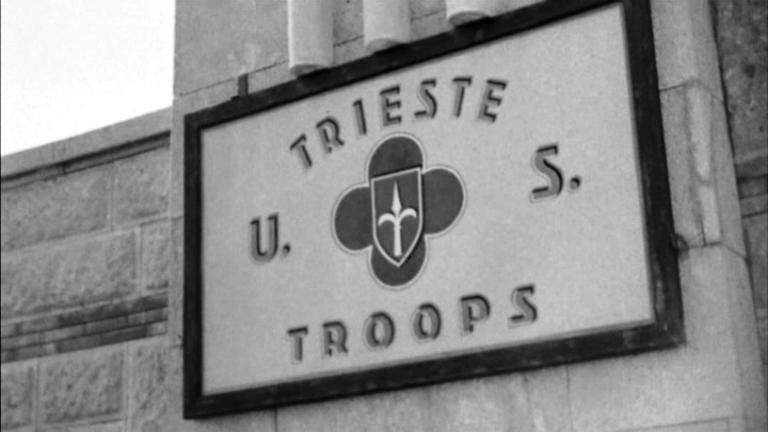

=== Returning home ===
The regiment departed Leghorn, Italy on 30 November 1954 aboard the Military Sea Transportation Service USNS General Sturgis as shipment #19069-A. Returning to Camp Kilmer, New Jersey, the regiment inactivated at Fort Rucker, Alabama on 30 September 1956. Personnel and equipment were used to reactivate the 99th Infantry Battalion of World War II fame. This unit was in turn inactivated on 24 March 1958 when the U.S. Army adopted the Pentomic force organization and the infantry unit at Fort Rucker was reorganized and reflagged as the 2nd Battle Group, 31st Infantry, a unit organized for Aviation Center training support. When the U.S. Army reorganized into brigades and battalions in the early 1960s, the designation of 2-31st Infantry was reassigned to the 7th Infantry Division in Korea and the unit at Fort Rucker was reflagged as the 5th Battle Group, 31st Infantry. The 5-31st Infantry lineage, less personnel and equipment, was later reassigned to the 197th Infantry Brigade (Separate) at Fort Benning, Georgia, effective 23 June 1967 as the 5th Battalion, 31st Infantry; however, an infantry presence remained at Fort Rucker in the form of Company E (Ranger), 30th Infantry, activated on 25 August 1966 and later inactivated on 1 July 1978. Additionally, the Pathfinder Team, HHC, 2d Battle Group, 31st Infantry, formed in 1960, was reflagged as 5th Infantry Detachment (Pathfinder) effective 24 June 1963, and later expanded and reflagged as Company C (Pathfinder), 509th Infantry, activated effective 1 July 1975. C-509th was inactivated on 31 May 1993 and its personnel and equipment were reflagged as Company A (Pathfinder), 511th Infantry, and activated on 1 June 1993. A-511th was inactivated due to lowered budget ceilings on 31 October 1995, ending the post-war infantry presence at Fort Rucker that had begun with the 351st Infantry Regiment.

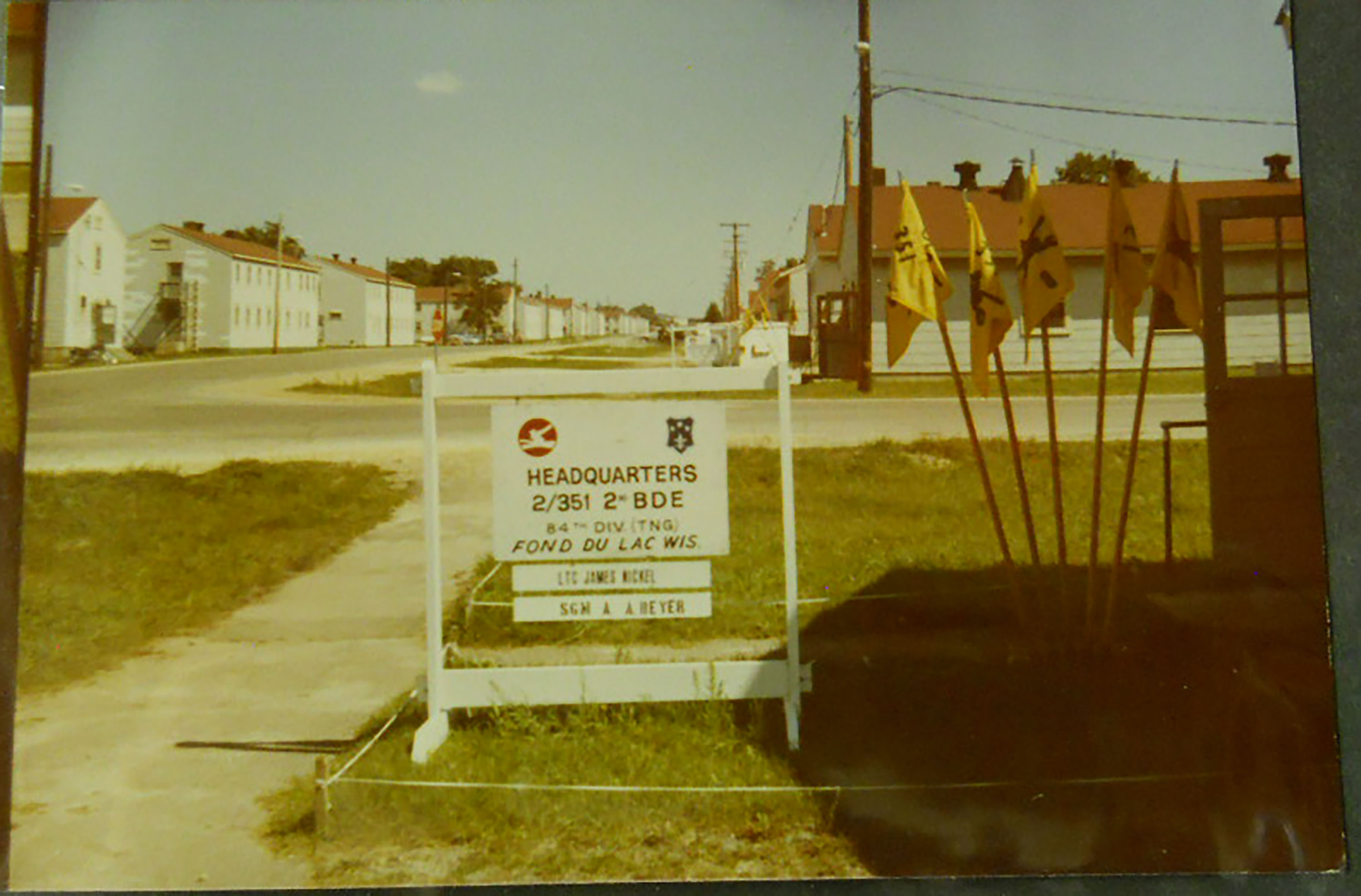
2nd Battalion conducting Annual Training at Fort McCoy in the 1980s

=== Under the 84th Training Division ===
The 351st Infantry was redesignated as the 351st Regiment, and reorganized to consist of the 1st, 2nd, and 3rd Battalions, elements of the 84th Division (Training) on 31 January 1968. On 16 September 1995, the regimental headquarters and the 3rd Battalion were inactivated.

=== Current Assignment ===
The 1st Battalion is a Regular Army Logistics unit assigned to the 181st Infantry Brigade at Fort McCoy, Wisconsin with a mission to train echelon above brigade Combat Sustainment Support Battalions and a Medical brigade. The 2nd Battalion is a Regular Army Infantry unit assigned to the 177th Armored Brigade at Camp Shelby, Mississippi with a mission to train infantry units of the National Guard.

The 3rd Battalion is a Regular Army Aviation unit assigned to the 166th Aviation Brigade at Fort Hood, Texas with a mission to train Aviation Battalions.

== Campaign streamers ==
Conflict	Streamer	Year(s)
World War I	Alsace	1918
World War II	Rome-Arno	1944
World War II	North Apennines	1944-1945
World War II	Po Valley	1945

== Decorations ==
Ribbon	Award	Embroidered	Year	Earned by
	Presidential Unit Citation	MT. CAPELLO, ITALY	1944	2nd Battalion
	Presidential Unit Citation	LAIATICO, ITALY	1944	3rd Battalion
	Meritorious Unit Commendation	Afghanistan Retrograde 2021-2022	2021-2022	1st Battalion
	Army Superior Unit Award	2007-2008	2007-2008	1st Battalion
	Army Superior Unit Award	2008-2011	2008-20011	1st and 2nd Battalions
	Croix de Guerre	Central Italy	1944-1945	Entire Regiment
None	Secretary of the Army Superior Unit Certificate	None	1962	Headquarters Company of 2nd Battalion

== Shoulder sleeve insignia ==

- Description: On a background equally divided horizontally white and red, 3 1/4 inches (83 mm) high and 2 1/2 inches (64 mm) wide at base and 2 1/8 inches (54 mm) wide at top, a black block letter "A", 2 3/4 inches (70 mm) high, 2 inches (51 mm) wide at base and 1 5/8 inches (41 mm) wide at top, all members 7/16 inch (11 mm) wide, all enclosed within a 1/8 inch (3.2 mm) Army Green border.
- Symbolism:
1. The red and white of the background are the colors used in flags for Armies.
2. The letter "A" represents "Army" and is also the first letter of the alphabet suggesting "First Army."
- Background:
1. A black letter "A" was approved as the authorized insignia by the Commanding General, American Expeditionary Force, on 16 November 1918 and approved by the War Department on 5 May 1922.
2. The background was added on 17 November 1950.

== Distinctive unit insignia ==
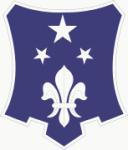

- Description/Blazon A silver color metal and enamel device 1 1/16 inches (27 mm) in height overall consisting of a shield blazoned: Azure, in chief three mullets one and two, the lower ones with two points up and one-half the size of the upper, in base a fleur-de-lis Argent.
- Symbolism The shield is blue for Infantry; the three stars are taken from the state flag of Minnesota, the "North Star State," the large star at the top representing the North Star. The fleur-de-lis symbolizes the service of the organization in France during World War I.
- Background The distinctive unit insignia was originally approved for the 351st Regiment Infantry, Organized Reserves on 28 Apr 1928. It was redesignated for the 351st Regiment (AIT) on 12 Aug 1960.

== Coat of arms ==

- Description/Blazon
  - Shield: Azure, in chief three mullets one and two, the lower ones with two points up and one-half the size of the upper, in base a fleur-de-lis Argent.
  - Crest: That for the regiments and separate battalions of the Army Reserve: On a wreath of the colors Argent and Azure, the Lexington Minute Man Proper. The statue of the Minute Man, Captain John Parker (H.H. Kitson, sculptor), stands on the Common in Lexington, Massachusetts.
  - Motto: TOUJOURS PRÊT (Always Ready).
- Symbolism
  - Shield: The shield is blue for Infantry; the three stars are taken from the state flag of Minnesota, the "North Star State," the large star at the top representing the North Star. The fleur-de-lis symbolizes the service of the organization in France during World War I.
  - Crest: The crest is that of the United States Army Reserve.
  - Background : The coat of arms was originally approved for the 351st Regiment Infantry, Organized Reserve on 28 Apr 1928. It was amended to delete the crest on 2 Dec 1955. On 12 Aug 1960 the coat of arms was redesignated with the Army Reserve crest added for the 351st Regiment
