= Oaks Historic District (Beaumont, Texas) =

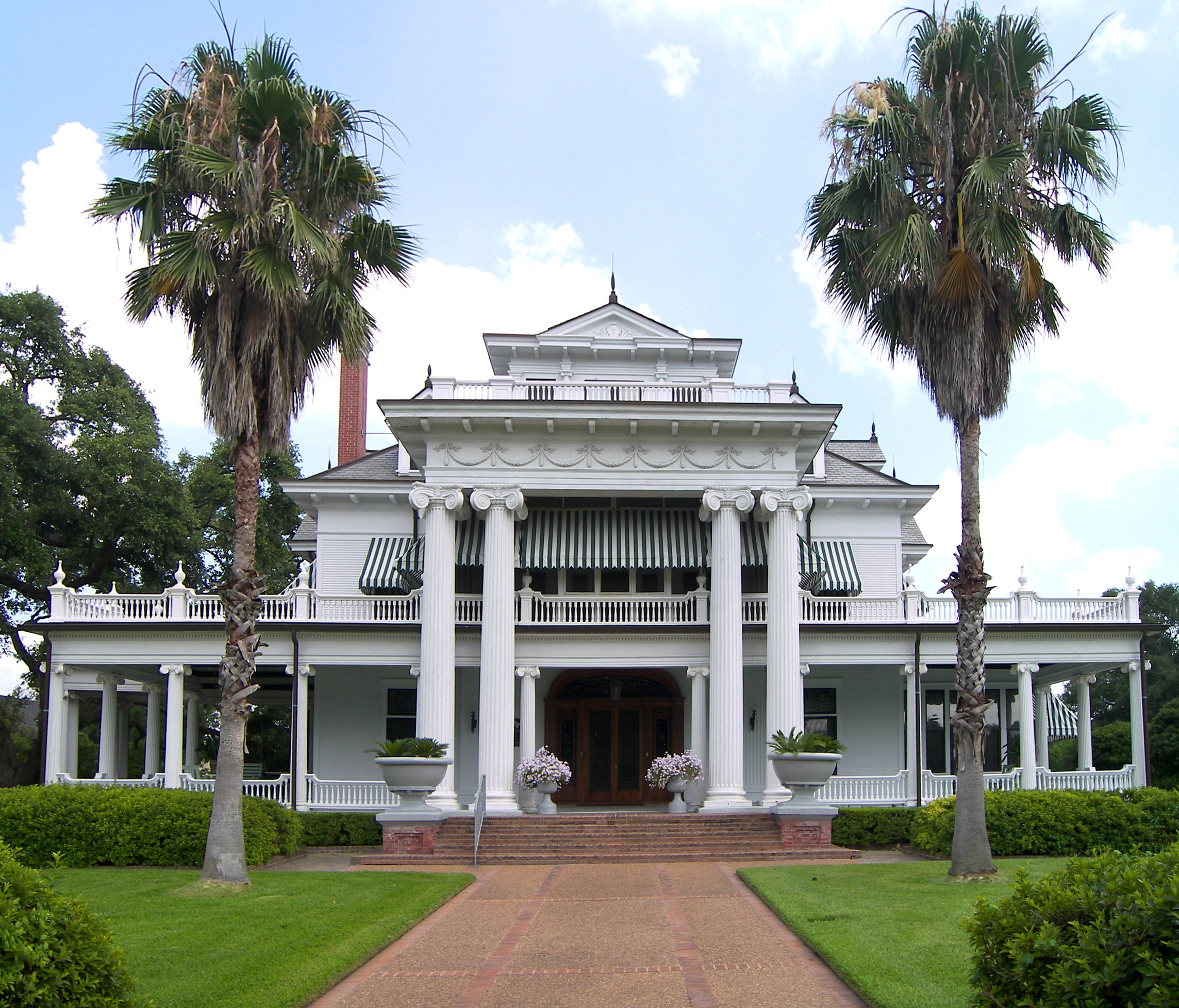
- McFaddin-Ward House, now a museum

- Location within Texas Location within the United States
- 30°5′12″N 94°7′15″W
- Type: Beaumont Municipal Historic District
- Location: Beaumont, Texas

The Oaks Historic District, is a collection of historic homes and businesses in Beaumont, Texas. The area is roughly bound by I-10 to the north and Smart St. to the south and from 11th St. on the west to 1st St. to the east. Many of the historic homes are restored and still used as residences today. The district is just west of downtown.

== Gallery ==
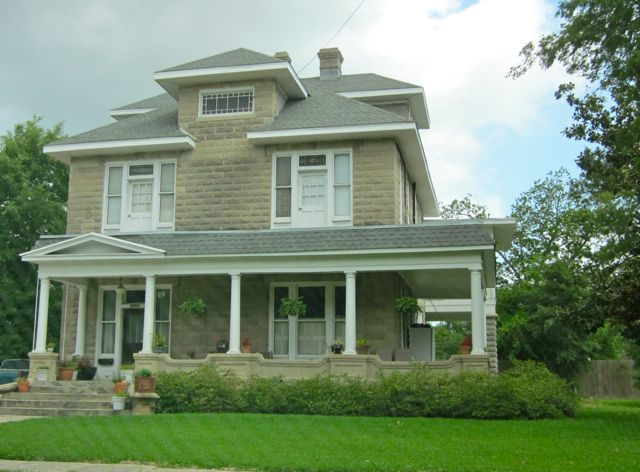

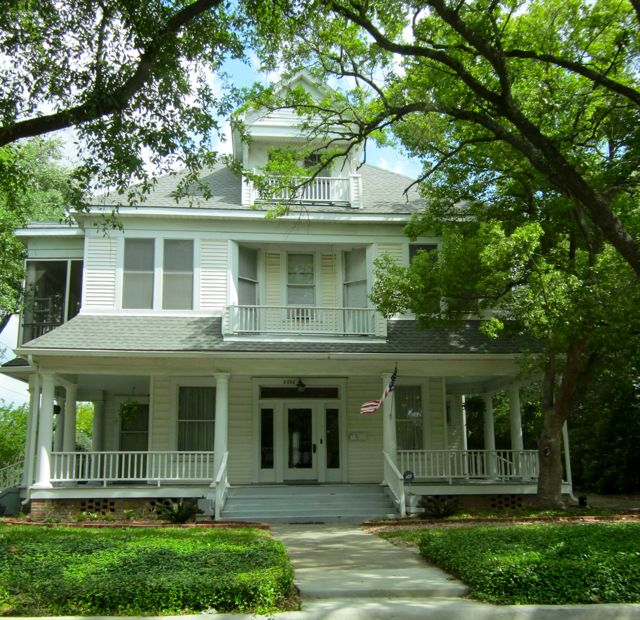

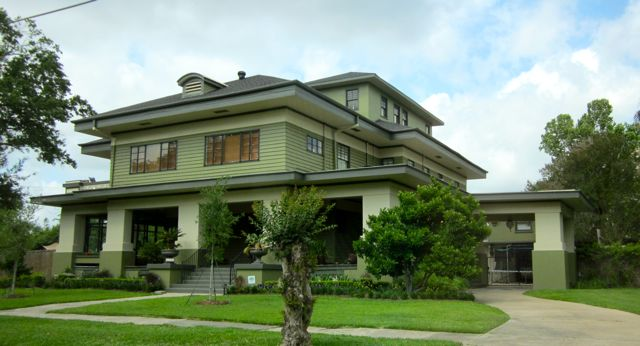

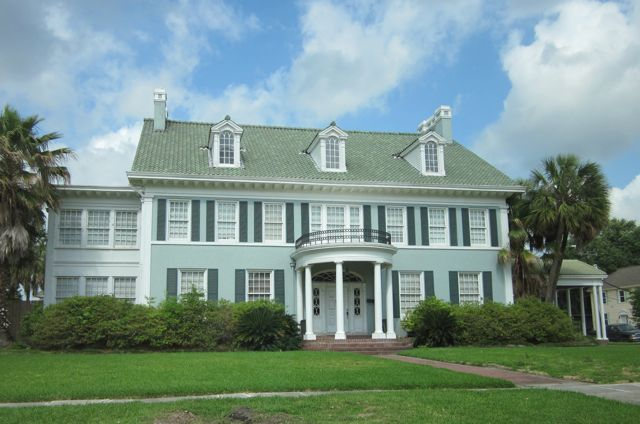

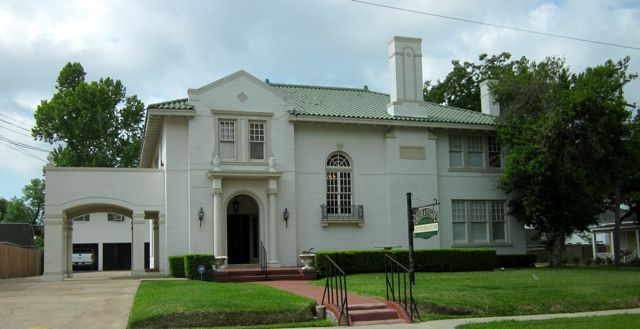

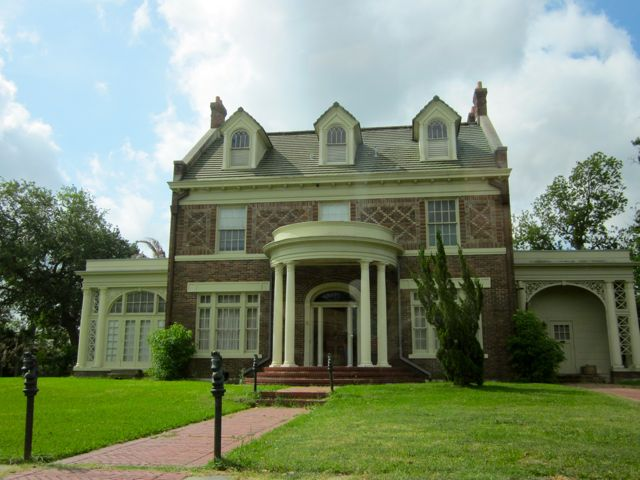

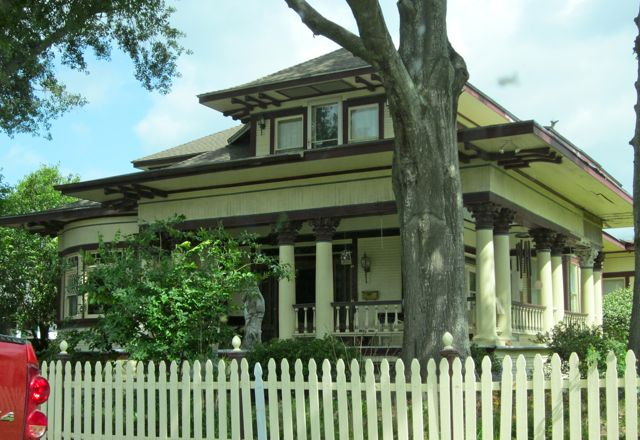

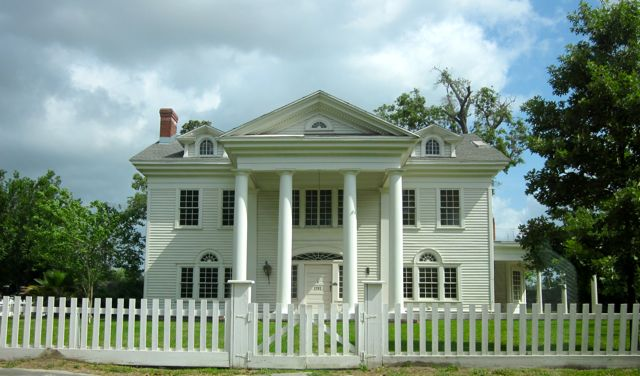

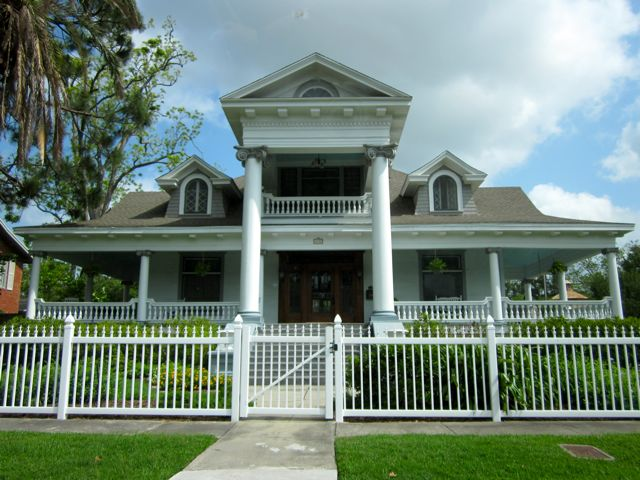

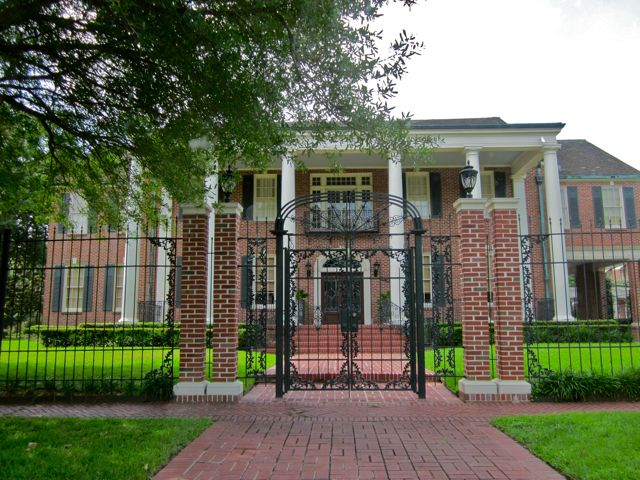

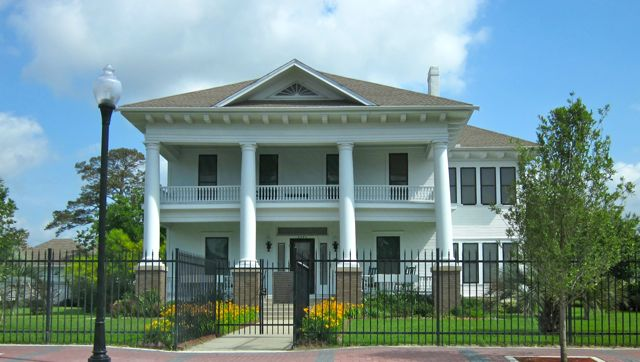
Chambers House
2240 Calder Avenue
