= Frank J. Kimball =

American politician

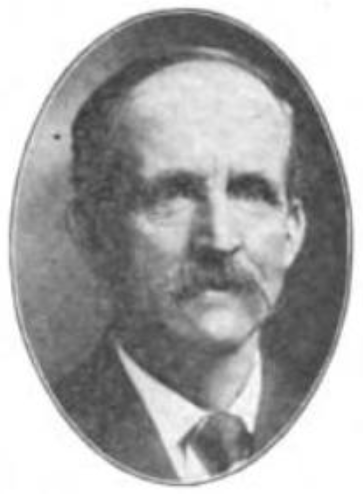

Member of the Wisconsin State Assembly
- Constituency: Adams and Marquette Counties
- In office 1902–1904
- In office 1906–1910

Personal details
- Born: November 24, 1846 Washington County, New York
- Died: March 31, 1927 (aged 80) Briggsville, Wisconsin
- Party: Republican
- Occupation: Farmer, businessman, politician

Frank J. Kimball (November 24, 1846 – March 31, 1927) was an American farmer, businessman, and politician.

== Biography ==
Born in Washington County, New York, Kimball moved to a farm in Columbia County, Wisconsin. In 1872, Kimball moved to Briggsville, Marquette County, Wisconsin. He was in the general merchandise and sewing machine businesses. Kimball served as Douglas, Wisconsin town clerk and notary public. He also served on the school board and was the board clerk. In 1903, 1907, and 1909, Kimball served in the Wisconsin State Assembly and was a Republican. Kimball retired in 1924 and then died at his home in Briggsville, Wisconsin.
