= Joy Castro =

Author and academic

- Born: 1967 (age 58–59); Miami, Florida, U.S.
- Education: Trinity University (BA); Texas A&M University (MA, PhD)
- Website: joycastro.com

Joy Castro is an American novelist, memoirist, and essayist. She is currently the Willa Cather Professor of English and Ethnic Studies (Latinx Studies) at the University of Nebraska-Lincoln, where she directs the Institute for Ethnic Studies.

== Early life ==
Castro spent her early childhood in Miami, Florida, and in London (UK). She lived in West Virginia from age 7 through high school graduation. Of her childhood, Castro said in 2021 that she "came from a very restricted, oppressive background — I was first-gen, from a background of poverty, and from a fundamentalist Christian sect that did not believe, for example, in evolution or in voting — and yet somehow I had always been hungry for the life of the mind."

== Career ==
Castro's work in nonfiction and fiction has explored her own history of abuse and political and social commentary, often under the guise of crime fiction, describing it as "the genre of justice."

She is the founding series editor of Machete, a series in innovative literary nonfiction at The Ohio State University Press. She served as the guest judge of CRAFT's first Creative Nonfiction Award, and her work has appeared in venues including Poets & Writers, Writer's Digest, Literary Hub, Crime Reads, The Rumpus, Ploughshares, The Brooklyn Rail, Senses of Cinema, Salon, Gulf Coast, Brevity, Seneca Review, Los Angeles Review of Books, and The New York Times Magazine. She was a Writer-in-Residence at Vanderbilt University.

== Critical reception for recent works ==
Of Flight Risk, Melissa Scholes Young said in Fiction Writers Review: "Even when relying on our own roots, we are excavating the generations who walked this road before we set a foot upon it. Reclaiming those roots as part of our own identity rather than covering them for the smoother path is also an act of revolution, especially when that existence was impoverished. When the narrator in Flight Risk comments that hunger is a secret to keep and claims the shame of wanting food in an abundant world, there is a revelation that readers must wrestle with their own indictment in. If poverty is a feminist issue, we must not look away but rather consider how discriminations and prejudice of gender persist. Flight Risk rises to this challenge and reveals hope for a world where women might be valued and self-determining. There is beauty and peace in Isabel Morales’ vision of justice for herself and the land she loves."

Introducing Castro's short fiction, "Ein Haus am Meer," in The Brooklyn Rail, Will Chancellor said, "the story's pacing, mood, and questioning achieve the aim of great ekphrasis: to capture transitory, elusive beauty and communicate its vital energy."

== Publications ==
=== Novels ===
- One Brilliant Flame. [S.l.]: LAKE UNION PUBLISHING. 2023. ISBN 978-1-5420-3804-1. OCLC 1313904885.
- Flight Risk. Seattle. 2021. ISBN 978-1-5420-3192-9. OCLC 1260291843.
- Hell or High Water (1st ed.). New York: Thomas Dunne Books. 2012. ISBN 978-1-250-00457-4. OCLC 744290595.
- Castro, Joy (2013). Nearer Gome (1st ed.). New York. ISBN 978-1-250-00458-1. OCLC 811597703.

=== Short story collections ===
- How Winter Began. Lincoln. 2015. ISBN 978-0-8032-8481-4. OCLC 918855645.

=== Memoirs ===
- The Truth Book (1st ed.). Lincoln: University of Nebraska Press. 2012. ISBN 978-0-8032-4062-9. OCLC 785862719.

=== Essay collections ===
- Island of Bones. Lincoln: University of Nebraska Press. 2012. ISBN 978-0-8032-7144-9. OCLC 808215605.

=== As editor ===
- Family Trouble: Memoirists on the Hazards and Rewards of Revealing Family. Joy Castro. Lincoln: University of Nebraska Press. 2013. ISBN 978-1-4619-3723-4. OCLC 855534603.

== Awards and nominations ==
- 2022 International Thriller Award finalist, for Flight Risk
- Nebraska Book Award, for Hell or High Water
- International Latino Book Award, for Island of Bones
