= Douglas, Wisconsin =

- Town
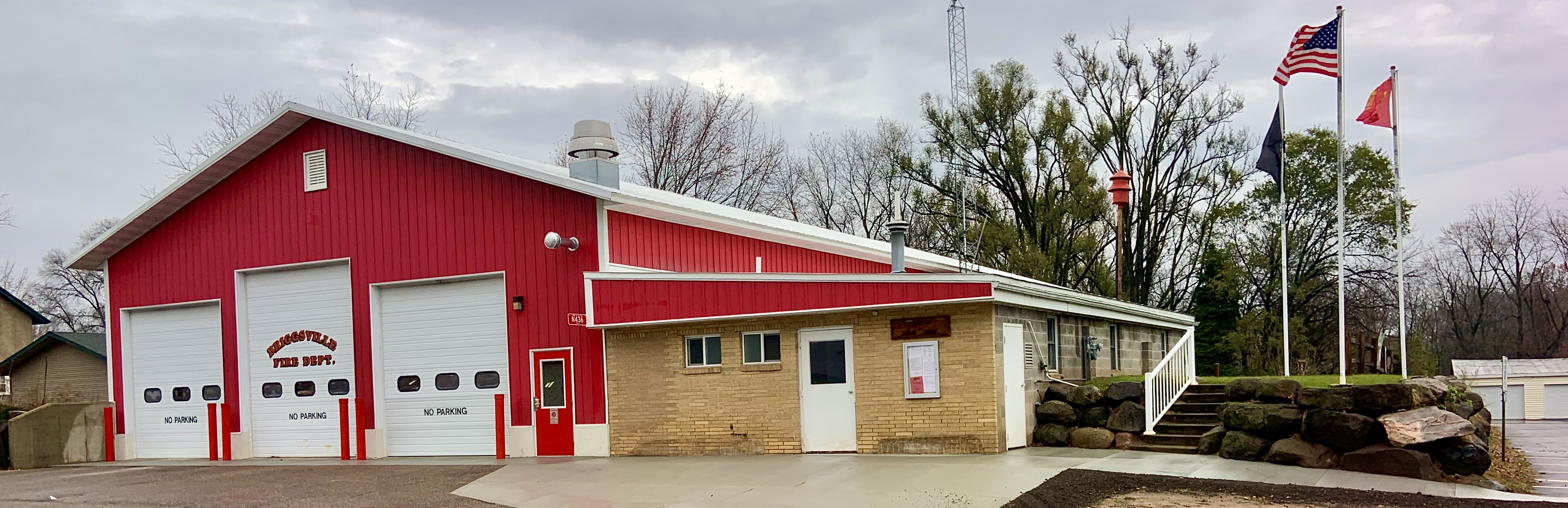
- Town hall in Briggsville

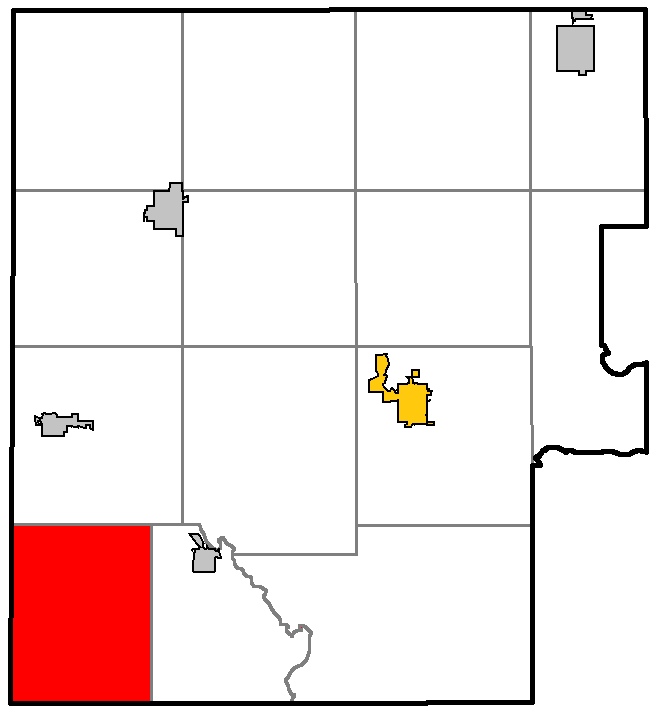
- Location of Douglas, Marquette County, Wisconsin

- Location of Marquette County, Wisconsin
- Coordinates: 43°40′47″N 89°33′32″W
- Country: United States
- State: Wisconsin
- County: Marquette

Area
  - Total: 29.2 sq mi (75.6 km^{2})
  - Land: 28.8 sq mi (74.7 km^{2})
  - Water: 0.35 sq mi (0.9 km^{2})
- Elevation: 807 ft (246 m)

Population (2020)
  - Total: 784
  - Density: 27.2/sq mi (10.5/km^{2})
- Time zone: UTC-6 (Central (CST))
  - Summer (DST): UTC-5 (CDT)
- FIPS code: 55-20525
- GNIS feature ID: 1583091

Douglas (at one time spelled Douglass) is a town in Marquette County, Wisconsin, United States. The population was 784 at the 2020 census. The unincorporated communities of Briggsville and Douglas Center are located within the town.

== Geography ==
According to the United States Census Bureau, the town has a total area of 29.2 square miles (75.6 km^{2}), of which 28.9 square miles (74.7 km^{2}) is land and 0.3 square mile (0.9 km^{2}) (1.20%) is water.

== Demographics ==
As of the census of 2000, there were 768 people, 301 households, and 229 families residing in the town. The population density was 26.6 people per square mile (10.3/km^{2}). There were 382 housing units at an average density of 13.2 per square mile (5.1/km^{2}). The racial makeup of the town was 97.40% White, 0.78% African American, 0.26% Native American, 0.78% from other races, and 0.78% from two or more races. Hispanic or Latino people of any race were 0.91% of the population.

There were 301 households, out of which 25.9% had children under the age of 18 living with them, 62.5% were married couples living together, 7.3% had a female householder with no husband present, and 23.9% were non-families. 19.3% of all households were made up of individuals, and 8.0% had someone living alone who was 65 years of age or older. The average household size was 2.55 and the average family size was 2.88.

In the town, the population was spread out, with 23.8% under the age of 18, 3.8% from 18 to 24, 28.1% from 25 to 44, 25.4% from 45 to 64, and 18.9% who were 65 years of age or older. The median age was 41 years. For every 100 females, there were 101.6 males. For every 100 females age 18 and over, there were 112.0 males.

The median income for a household in the town was $43,839, and the median income for a family was $47,813. Males had a median income of $35,288 versus $21,708 for females. The per capita income for the town was $19,151. About 2.3% of families and 6.1% of the population were below the poverty line, including 6.6% of those under age 18 and 3.1% of those age 65 or over.

== Education ==
School districts that have portions of the town include: Portage Community School District, Wisconsin Dells School District, and Westfield School District.
