= Jonathan Edwards =

Jonathan Edwards may refer to:

== Musicians ==
- Jonathan and Darlene Edwards, pseudonym of bandleader Paul Weston and his wife, singer Jo Stafford
- Jonathan Edwards (musician) (born 1946), American musician
  - Jonathan Edwards (album), debut album of the musician
- Jonathan Edwards, known as John Edwards, American R&B singer

== Political figures ==
- Jonathan Edwards (New York politician) (1798–1875), American lawyer and politician
- Jonathan Edwards (Welsh politician) (born 1976), Member of Parliament since 2010

== Religious figures ==
- Jonathan Edwards (priest) (1615–1681), Archdeacon of Derry
- Jonathan Edwards (academic) (1629–1712), theologian and principal of Jesus College, Oxford 1686–1712
- Jonathan Edwards (theologian) (1703–1758), American revivalist, preacher, theologian; president of Princeton University
- Jonathan Edwards (the younger) (1745–1801), his son, American theologian

== Sports figures ==
- Johnathan Edwards (American football) (born 2001), American football cornerback
- Jonathan Edwards (triple jumper) (born 1966), British triple jumper
- Jonathan Edwards (luger) (born 1972), American luger
- Johnathan Edwards (born 1984), Welsh rugby union footballer
- Jon Edwards (baseball) (born 1988), American Major League player
- Jonathan Edwards (English footballer) (born 1996), English footballer

== Others ==
- Jonathan Edwards (Washington & Jefferson College) (1817–1891), first president of Washington & Jefferson College
- Jonathan Edwards (numismatist) (1841–1886), American physician and numismatist
- Jonathan Edwards (poet) (born 1979), Welsh poet

== See also ==
- Jonathan Edwards College, a residential college at Yale University, named after the elder theologian
- John Edwards (disambiguation)
