= William J. Maier =

American politician

William J. Maier as a second term New York Assemblyman in 1906.

William J. Maier (September 13, 1876 in Seneca Falls, Seneca County, New York – December 1941) was an American politician from New York. He served seven terms in the New York State Assembly, and was briefly in 1922 New York State Comptroller.

== Biography ==
Maier was educated at Mynderse Academy before attending Albany Law School, from which he graduated in 1900 with a LL.B. degree.

Maier subsequently spent two years in Europe before going to work at the law firm of McDonald Brothers.

He was a member of the New York State Assembly (Seneca Co.) in 1905, 1906, 1914, 1915 and 1916; and was Chairman of the Committee on Electricity, Gas and Water Supply in 1915, and Chairman of the Committee on Ways and Means in 1916.

Upon his retirement from the Assembly, Maier was appointed as Deputy Fiscal Supervisor for the State of New York.

In February 1917, Maier was appointed as a Deputy to State Comptroller Eugene M. Travis, effective March 1.

Maier was later appointed Chief Deputy Comptroller by Governor-elect Nathan L. Miller on December 31, 1920.

In May 1922, Maier was promoted to New York State Comptroller by Governor Miller to fill the unexpired term of Comptroller James A. Wendell following his death. Maier lost a bid for re-election in 1922 by Democrat James W. Fleming, however.

After leaving government service, Maier was elected Chairman of the New York State Republican Committee, a role which he occupied from 1929 to 1930. He was additionally a delegate to the 1936 Republican National Convention.

== Works ==
- "The State Comptroller: His Powers and Duties," in New York Red Book, Albany, NY: J.B. Lyon Company, 1922; pp. 21–23.

New York State Assembly
| Preceded by John F. Crosby | New York State Assembly; Seneca County; 1905–1906 | Succeeded by William B. Harper |
| Preceded by Augustus S. Hughes | New York State Assembly; Seneca County; 1914–1916 | Succeeded by Lewis W. Johnson |
Political offices
| Preceded by James A. Wendell | New York State Comptroller; 1922 | Succeeded by James W. Fleming |
Party political offices
| Preceded by James A. Wendell | Republican nominee for New York State Comptroller; 1922 | Succeeded by Vincent B. Murphy |
| Preceded by H. Edmund Machold | Chairman of the New York Republican State Committee; 1929–1930 | Succeeded by W. Kingsland Macy |
