= Bitten by the Tiger =

2013 book by Jack O'Donnell

- First edition
- Author: Jack O'Donnell
- Language: English
- Subject: William Sulzer
- Genre: Non-fiction
- Publisher: Chapel Hill Press
- Publication date: 2013
- Publication place: United States

Bitten by the Tiger: The True Story of Impeachment, the Governor & Tammany Hall is a book written by the New York State politics and government expert Jack O'Donnell and was published by Chapel Hill Press in 2013. The book details one of the biggest news stories of 1913; the rise, achievement and fall of the first and only Governor in New York to be impeached, William Sulzer. Carefully researched by O'Donnell, the book examines what he explains as "the unique events that allowed history to remember Sulzer as the 'wronged reformer' and kept the true story hidden for 100 years." With the use of transcripts from Sulzer's impeachment trial, as well as other first hand and original accounts, O'Donnell offers the reader the true story behind William Sulzer, as well as others who took part in these events. Well known individuals such as Al Smith, William Randolph Hearst, Robert Wagner and Tammany Hall boss Charlie Murphy.

== Reception ==
Bitten by the Tiger has received several positive reviews:

"Bitten By The Tigers is an absorbing, intelligent, and sometimes startling account of a vanished era. The time is long gone but the story offers a unique window into politics. It will appeal to history buffs, and anyone who seeks to understand politics today." - The Front Page Newspaper Group

"A vivid tale. Reads like a thriller. Hard to put down." - South Buffalo News

"The saga of Gov. William Sulzer’s impeachment a century ago cannot be told often enough, both as an object lesson and as urban melodrama. Jack O’Donnell’s Bitten by the Tiger (Chapel Hill Press) is a welcome addition to the growing genre." - Sam Roberts, The New York Times

"It's remarkable that this story which was national news at the time is little more than a political footnote, even in the Empire State. This is a must read for any student of New York politics and should be required reading for all state lawmakers." - Bob Hardt, NY1 Political Director
