= Clark Williams (New York politician) =

American banker & politician (1870–1946)

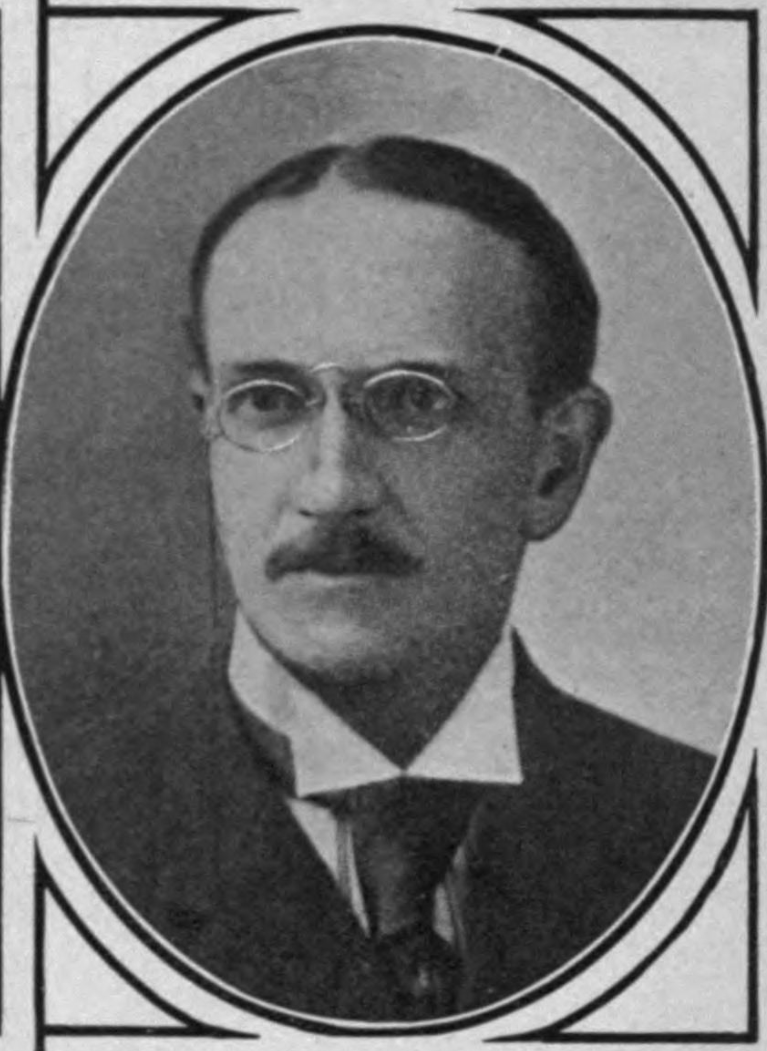
- Williams in 1909

New York State Comptroller
- In office 1909–1910

Personal details
- Born: Myron Clark Williams; May 2, 1870 Canandaigua, New York
- Died: December 18, 1946 (aged 76) Greenwich, Connecticut
- Spouse: Anna Murphy Plater (m. 1897)
- Education: Williams College
- Occupation: Banker, politician

Myron Clark Williams (May 2, 1870 – December 18, 1946) was an American banker and politician.

== Life ==
Born in Canandaigua, Ontario County, New York, Williams was the son of George N. Williams, a banker, and Abigail (Clark) Williams (daughter of Governor Myron H. Clark). He was educated at Canandaigua Academy, and graduated from Williams College in 1892, as a member of Kappa Alpha Society. He later served for many years as a Trustee of Williams. After graduation, he became a clerk at the First National Bank in New York City, then at the New York Guarantee and Indemnity Company, and later at the United States Mortgage and Trust Company of which he became vice president. On April 29, 1897, he married Anna Murphy Plater in Nashville, Tennessee, a portrait of whom by the Swiss-born American artist Adolfo Müller-Ury is in the Williams College Faculty Club/Alumni Center, Williamstown.

In 1905, he left US Mortgage & Trust to co-organize the Columbia Trust Company of which he became vice president. On October 23, 1907, he was appointed by Governor Charles E. Hughes Superintendent of Banks. In November 1909, he was appointed New York State Comptroller to fill the vacancy caused by the death of Charles H. Gaus, and remained in office until the end of 1910. Afterwards he became President of the Windsor Trust Company and then of the Industrial Finance Corporation.

He served as a Red Cross representative with the First American Infantry Division in World War I. He was in the field at the Battles of Cantigny and Château-Thierry. Later he was field director of the Bureau of Army Field Service, in charge of all Red Cross service during the Argonnes Campaign. He finished the war with the rank of major, and in 1922, he was awarded the Conspicuous Service Cross for his services.

He died December 18, 1946, in Greenwich, Connecticut.

Mary Clark Thompson was his aunt.

Political offices
Preceded by Otto Kelsey; Acting	New York State Comptroller; 1909–1910	Succeeded by William Sohmer
