= William C. Wilson (New York politician) =

American politician (1866–1943)

Comptroller of New York
- In office November 8, 1906 – December 31, 1906
- Appointed by: Governor Frank W. Higgins
- Preceded by: Otto Kelsey (May 1906)
- Succeeded by: Charles H. Gaus

First Deputy Comptroller of New York
- In office 1903 – May 3, 1906
- Preceded by: Charles H. Gaus
- Succeeded by: Vacant

Personal details
- Born: July 22, 1866 Galesburg, Illinois, U.S.
- Died: November 29, 1943 (aged 77) Fair Haven, Vermont, U.S.
- Spouse: Adelaide Thompson Harrington
- Children: 4
- Education: Knox College; Columbia Law School
- Profession: Attorney

William Carr Wilson (July 22, 1866 – November 29, 1943) was an American lawyer and politician.

He was the Republican boss of the Twenty-Seventh Assembly District in New York City, and had a law office at 55, Liberty Street.

On May 3, 1900, he was appointed by Comptroller William J. Morgan one of the first five New York State Transfer Tax Appraisers for New York County under the new transfer tax law. He was First Deputy Comptroller under Otto Kelsey, and became Acting Comptroller upon Kelsey's resignation in May 1906. After months of delay, he finally was appointed New York State Comptroller by Governor Frank W. Higgins on November 8, 1906, to serve for the remainder of Kelsey's unexpired term.

== Sources ==
- The choice for tax appraisers, in NYT on April 30, 1900
- His appointment as tax appraiser, in NYT on May 4, 1900
- Kelsey's appointment as Supt. of Insurance, and resignation as Comptroller, in NYT on May 3, 1906
- His appointment as Comptroller, in NYT on November 9, 1906
- Political Graveyard (name misspelled)

Political offices
Preceded by Otto Kelsey	New York State Comptroller; 1906	Succeeded by Martin H. Glynn
