= Tutunjian =

Tutunjian (Armenian: Թիւթիւնճեան, derived from Turkish tütüncü [tütün "tobacco/smoke" + cü "agentive/profession suffix"], meaning "tobacconist" or "tobacco grower") is an Armenian surname. Notable people with the surname include:

- Damon Tutunjian, guitarist and vocalist of Swirlies
- George Tutunjian (1930–2007), Armenian singer
- Harry Tutunjian, American politician
