= Samuel Bell Thomas =

American lawyer

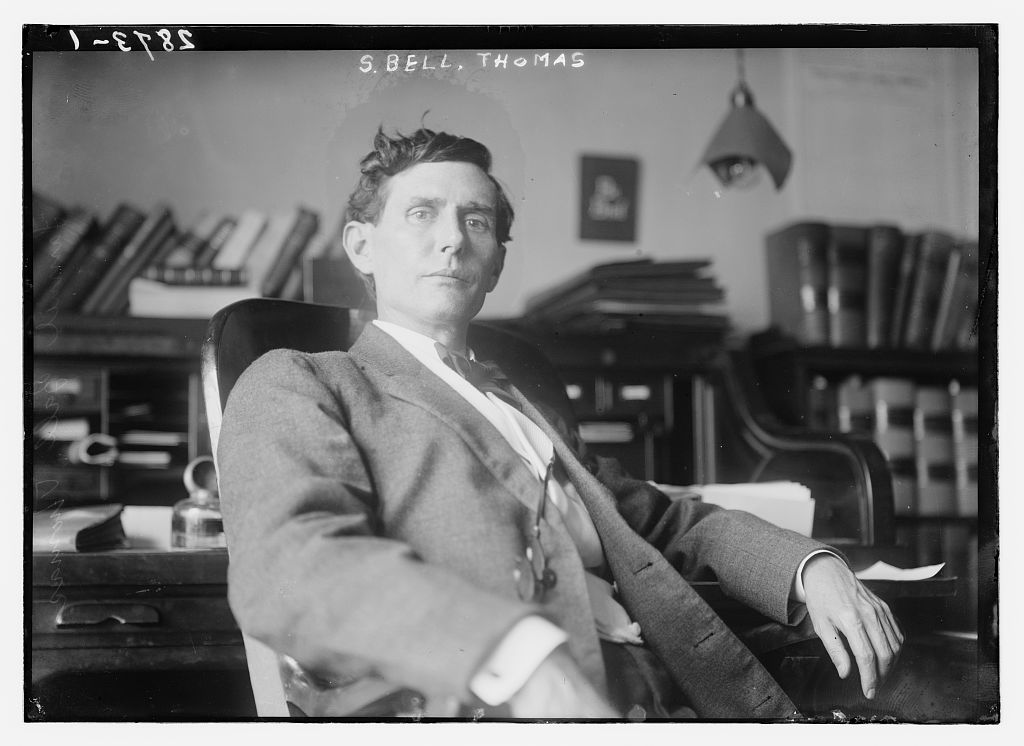

Samuel Bell Thomas (July 6, 1868 - October 11, 1943) was a New York lawyer who defended William Sulzer during his impeachment in 1913. He was the Commonwealth Land Party candidate for Justice of New York Supreme Court 1st District in 1924. Earlier in his career, he was the attorney of Albert T. Patrick in the famous Patrick-Rice trial. He died on October 11, 1943.

== Publications ==
- The boss, or the governor: the truth about the greatest political conspiracy in the history of America (1914)
- Our weakened Constitution: an historical and analytical study of the Constitution of the United States and of the additions to the original text undertaken to place the facts before the American people, and to emphasize the present necessity for a movement in behalf of an unvolated Constitution (1932)
