= Vincent B. Murphy =

American politician (1888–1956)

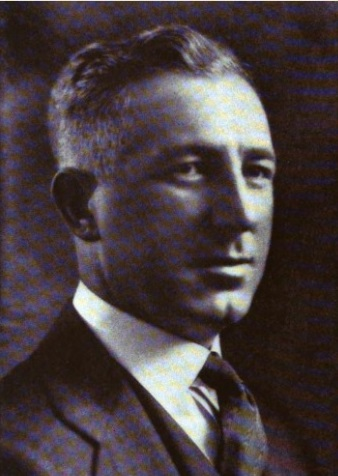
From 1925's Manual for the Use of the Legislature of the State of New York

Vincent Bernard Murphy (January 4, 1888 in Rochester, Monroe County, New York – February 25, 1956 in Washington, D.C.) was an American politician from New York.

== Life ==
He was the son of Daniel B. Murphy. He served in the U.S. Army during World War I.

He was a member of the New York State Assembly (Monroe Co., 3rd D.) in 1922, 1923 and 1924. He was New York State Comptroller from 1925 to 1926, elected on the Republican ticket at the New York state election, 1924, but defeated for re-election at the New York state election, 1926.

He was a delegate to the New York convention to ratify the 21st Amendment in 1933. He was a Knight of Columbus.

He was buried at the Arlington National Cemetery in Arlington, Virginia.

His son Vincent Bernard Murphy, Jr. (1928–2006), was President of the United States Equestrian Team from 1983 to 1989.

== See also ==
- List of Knights of Columbus members

Party political offices
Preceded by William J. Maier	Republican nominee for New York State Comptroller; 1924, 1926	Succeeded by Harry B. Crowley
New York State Assembly
Preceded by Harry B. Crowley	New York State Assembly; Monroe County, 3rd District; 1922–1924	Succeeded by Cosmo A. Cilano
Political offices
Preceded by James W. Fleming	New York State Comptroller; 1925–1926	Succeeded by Morris S. Tremaine
