= William Sohmer =

American politician

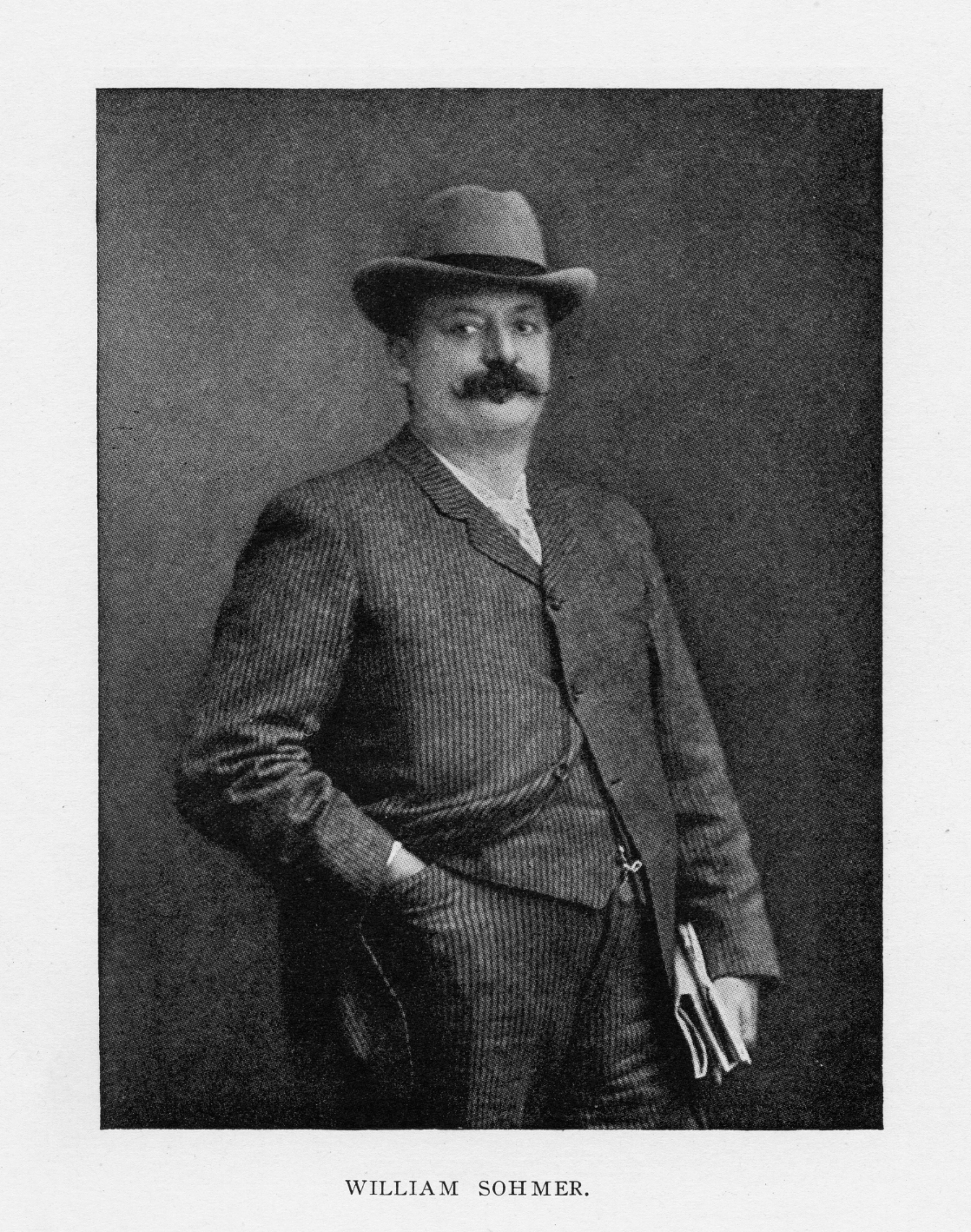

William Sohmer (May 26, 1852 in Dunningen, Kingdom of Württemberg – February 2, 1929 in Brooklyn, New York City) was an American politician.

== Life ==
He came with his parents in 1858 to New York City where his elder brother Hugo founded Sohmer & Co. in 1872. His father was a physician and cared about a good education for his sons. In 1872, he entered the insurance business, and finally became President of the Niagara Fire Insurance Company.

He was a member of the New York State Assembly (New York Co., 10th D.) in 1890, 1891 and 1892. Afterwards he was appointed a Deputy Tax Commissioner. In 1894, he was defeated when running for Sheriff of New York County. In 1895, he was elected Register of New York County, and in 1897 Clerk of New York County.

He was again a member of the State Assembly (New York Co., 10th D.) in 1904; and a member of the New York State Senate (12th D.) in 1907 and 1908.

He was New York State Comptroller from 1911 to 1914, elected at the New York state election, 1910 on the Democratic ticket; re-elected at the New York state election, 1912 on the Democratic and Independence League tickets; and defeated at the New York state election, 1914 for re-election running on both tickets again.

He was a delegate to the 1912 Democratic National Convention.

He was Treasurer of the Society of St. Tammany from 1910 on.

== Sources ==
- Georg von Skal: History of German immigration in the United States and successful German-Americans and their descendants. New York, Smiley, 1908, p. 127, 164
- The campaign expenses, in NYT on November 11, 1894
- The Tammany nominees, in NYT on October 11, 1895
- The campaign expenses, in NYT on November 10, 1897
- The Democratic candidates, in NYT on October 1, 1910
- The Democratic candidates, in NYT on October 4, 1912
- Death notice in TIME Magazine on March 4, 1929

Party political offices
Preceded by Martin H. Glynn	Democratic nominee for New York State Comptroller; 1910, 1912, 1914	Succeeded by Joseph W. Masters
New York State Assembly
Preceded by George F. Roesch	New York State Assembly; New York County, 10th District; 1890–1892	Succeeded by William Sulzer
Preceded by John F. McCullough	New York State Assembly; New York County, 10th District; 1904	Succeeded by Frederick J. Etzel
New York State Senate
Preceded by Samuel J. Foley	New York State Senate; 12th District; 1907–1908	Succeeded by Timothy D. Sullivan
Political offices
Preceded by Clark Williams	New York State Comptroller; 1911–1914	Succeeded by Eugene M. Travis
