= Murphy Brothers Playground =

Public park in Manhattan, New York

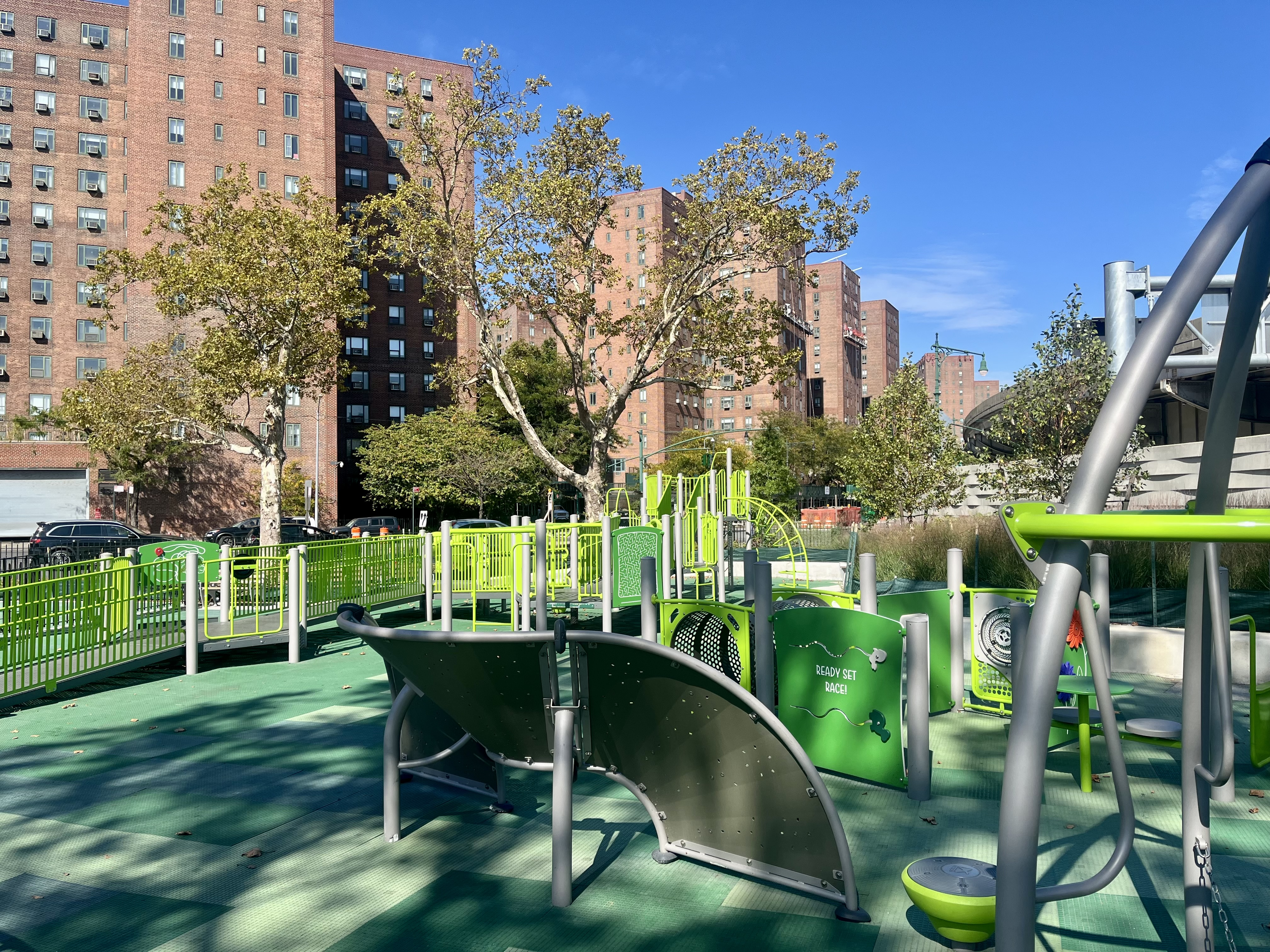
- The playground in 2025
- Interactive map of Murphy Brothers Playground
- Type: Urban park
- Location: Manhattan, New York City
- Coordinates: 40°43′49″N 73°58′24″W
- Area: 1.27 acres (0.51 ha)
- Opened: 1903
- Etymology: John J. and Charles F. Murphy
- Owner: New York City Department of Parks and Recreation

Murphy Brothers Playground is a 1.27-acre (0.51 ha) public park located on the east side of Avenue C between East 17th and 18th streets, across from the Stuyvesant Town–Peter Cooper Village neighborhood in Manhattan, New York City. Formerly known as John J. Murphy Park, the park was renamed Murphy's Brother's Playground in 1985 to honor Charles F. Murphy, the brother of John J. Murphy. The park includes two ballfields, a basketball court, two dog runs, and a playground.

== History ==
=== Opening and early years ===
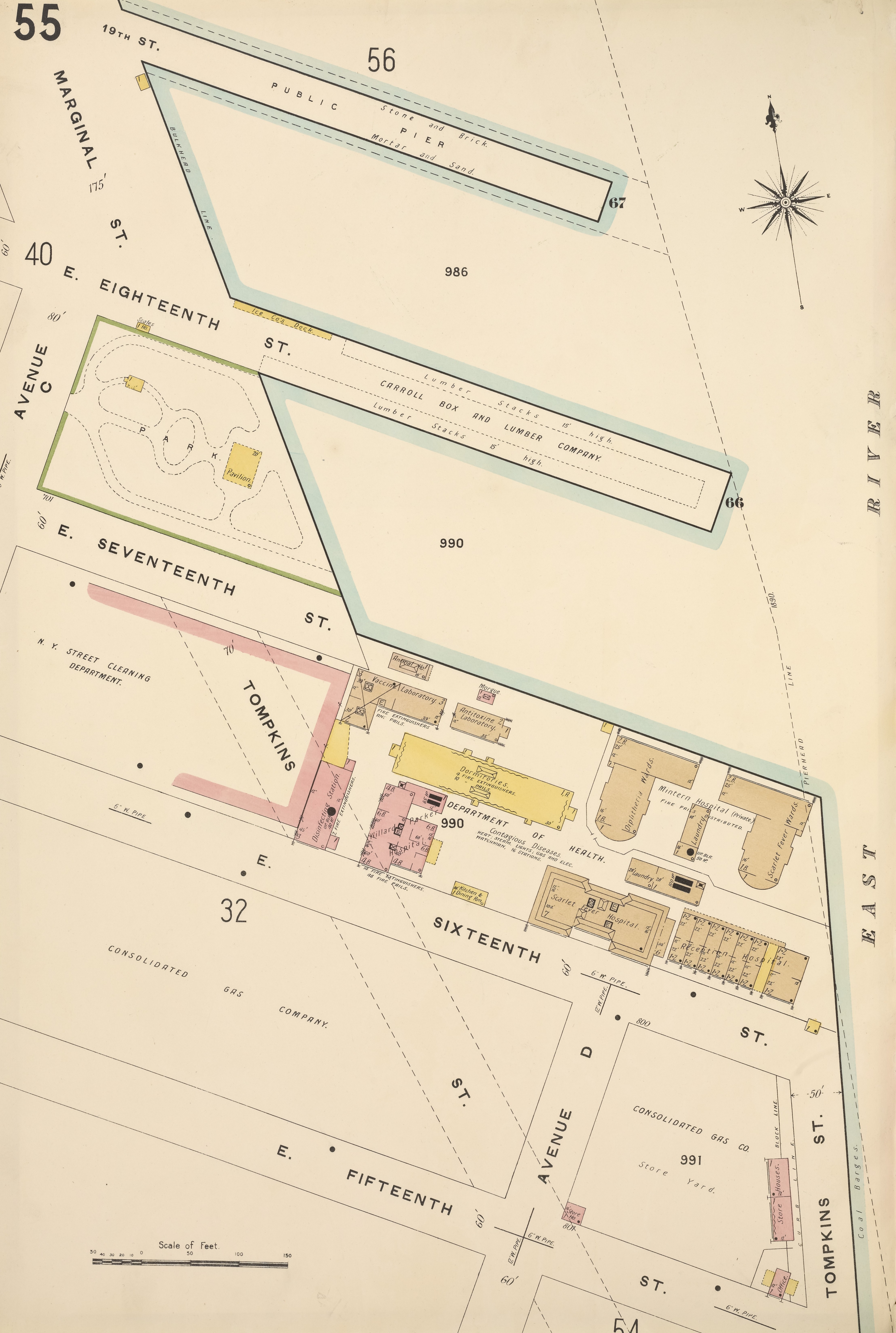
Map published in 1903 showing the unnamed park and Willard Parker Hospital

In the 1890s, the shoreline of the East River ran along the east side of Avenue C between East 17th and 18th streets. This land was filled in around the turn of the century by the Department of Docks, which created sand piles and a small beach to serve as a recreation center. In 1903, the property was transferred to the Department of Parks. Fencing and playground equipment were installed and grass was planted to create a 1.037-acre (0.420 ha) public park that was opened to the public that same year. The park also included an open pavilion and curved walkways. The unnamed park was initially referred to as "Seventeenth Street Park". By 1907, new drainage was installed to address issues with standing water following storms, which had caused unsanitary conditions and led to a one-year long closure of the park's playground.

On December 13, 1921, the Board of Aldermen adopted a resolution designating the park as "John J. Murphy Park". The resolution was approved by Mayor John Francis Hylan on December 16, 1921. Before the park was officially named, the land had also been unofficially called "Murphy Park". John J. Murphy had helped to transfer the land to the Parks Department when he served on the Common Council and his brother Charles F. Murphy, the Commissioner of Docks, had the land filled in for recreational purposes. John J. Murphy died on September 21, 1911, about ten years before the park was renamed in his honor. At the time of his death, his residence was located near the park at 309 East 17th Street. His brother Charles F. Murphy later died in 1924.

In 1939, the segment of the East River Drive between East 12th and 18th streets, which runs along the north and east sides of the park, first opened to traffic. When this section of the new highway was constructed, the area between the east side of the park and the East River Drive was backfilled; this land was later officially transferred to the Department of Parks in 1947. A reconstruction of John J. Murphy Park was completed in 1941, which involved completely redesigning the space to upgrade the facility as well as account for the new area that was added to the park during the construction of the East River Drive. The wooden pavilion was removed and the restroom was replaced with a new brick structure. Plans for the reconstruction were prepared by the Department of Parks and the work was performed by the Works Projects Administration. Usage of the park increased in the 1950s and 1960s following redevelopment of the Gas House District as Stuyvesant Town and Peter Cooper Village.

=== Late 20th century to present ===
In 1985, the park was renamed "Murphy's Brother's Playground" to honor Charles F. "Silent Charlie" Murphy, the brother of John J. Murphy. The reasoning behind the awkward naming, which does not recognize Charles F. Murphy directly, has remained a mystery. Shortly after the ribbon cutting ceremony, Murphy's Brother's Playground was taken over by homeless individuals and drug users. The park was also damaged by vandals. That year, one hundred students from Public School 40 on East 20th Street and the Epiphany School on East 22nd Street were sworn in by Mayor Ed Koch as the first group of "Parks Graffiti Fighters" in the mayor's new anti-graffiti program and proceeded to paint over graffiti at ten locations in the park.

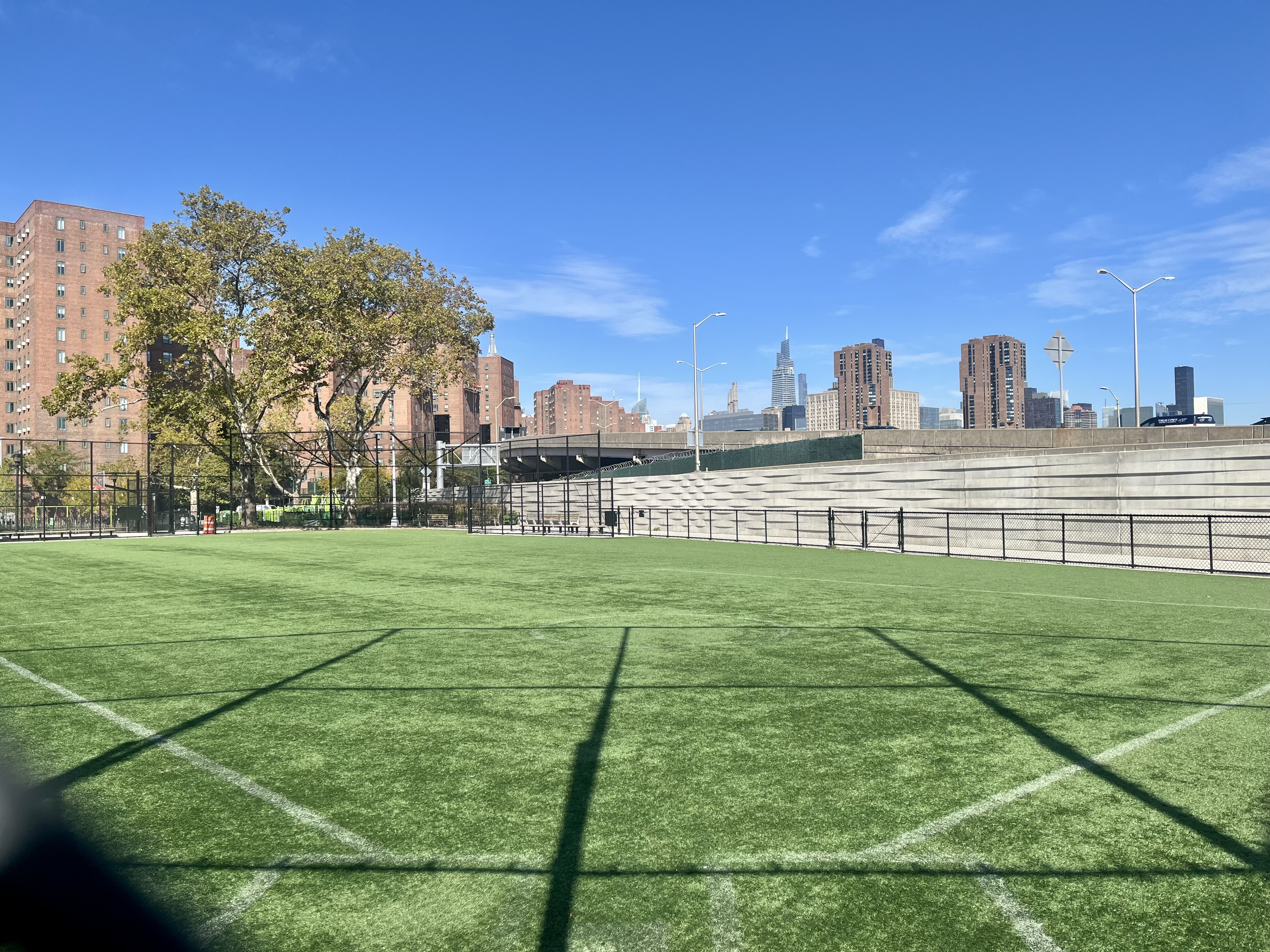
The ballfields and a floodwall from the East Side Coastal Resiliency project in 2025

In the early 1990s, local community members wanted to rename the park after Ed Mackey, who had coached Little League baseball at the site for many years. The proposal was considered by Parks Commissioner Betsy Gotbaum. Former Parks Commissioner Henry Stern was opposed to the renaming and said, "You don't change the name of a park that's been so designated. It's a shame that they would do such a thing." The park underwent a $582,000 reconstruction that was completed in 1994. The park's ballfields were later named in memory of Tim McGinn following his death in 2005. McGinn was a lawyer who resided at Peter Cooper Village; he served as a coach and board member for the Peter Stuyvesant Little League (PSLL) and had helped to get the surface of the ballfields converted from concrete to grass. The two ballfields at the park are used by the PSLL for seven- and eight-year-olds as well as younger children playing tee-ball.

In 2022, the park was closed and rebuilt to allow for the construction of a new floodwall with flood gates as part of the city's East Side Coastal Resiliency project. The park reopened in October 2024 and now includes two ballfields with an artificial turf surface, a basketball court, and a playground. Two dog runs were also added as part of the reconstruction (one for small dogs and one for large dogs). New signage was also installed that removed the apostrophes from the prior name and called the park "Murphy Brothers Playground". A project to add a restroom to the park commenced in June 2026.
