= William Patrick Madden =

American politician

Mayor of Troy, New York
- In office 2016–2023
- Preceded by: Lou Rosamilia
- Succeeded by: Carmella Mantello

Personal details
- Party: Democrat

William Patrick Madden is an American politician. He is the Democratic former mayor of Troy, New York. He was elected in 2015 and re-elected in 2019. His term ended December 31, 2023.

== Political career ==
Madden was elected as mayor of Troy on November 5, 2015, defeating James Gordon, Rodney Wiltshire, and Jack Cox.

On November 5, 2019, Madden was reelected as mayor, defeating Rodney Wiltshire, and Thomas Reale. The race was defined by efforts of Rensselaer County Republicans, including County Executive Steven McLaughlin, to pressure Reale to drop out of the mayoral race and endorse Wiltshire who was previously defeated in the Democratic primary by Madden.

== Terms as Mayor ==
During two terms, Madden successfully approved eight structurally-balanced budgets through the City Council.

Madden oversaw the start of replacement of water transmission lines between the Tomhannock Reservoir and the city's water treatment plant.

== Personal life ==
Born and raised in the City of Troy, Madden grew up in Troy's Eastside neighborhood where he attended Sacred Heart School. He is a graduate of the State University at Albany, and Albany Law School.

Madden is the younger sibling of former Rensselaer County Executive Kathleen Jimino.

== See also ==
- List of mayors of Troy, New York
