= List of mayors of Troy, New York =

The following is a list of mayors of the city of Troy, New York, United States. For the period between 1964 and 1994, Troy adopted a city-manager form of government and voters did not directly elect a mayor.

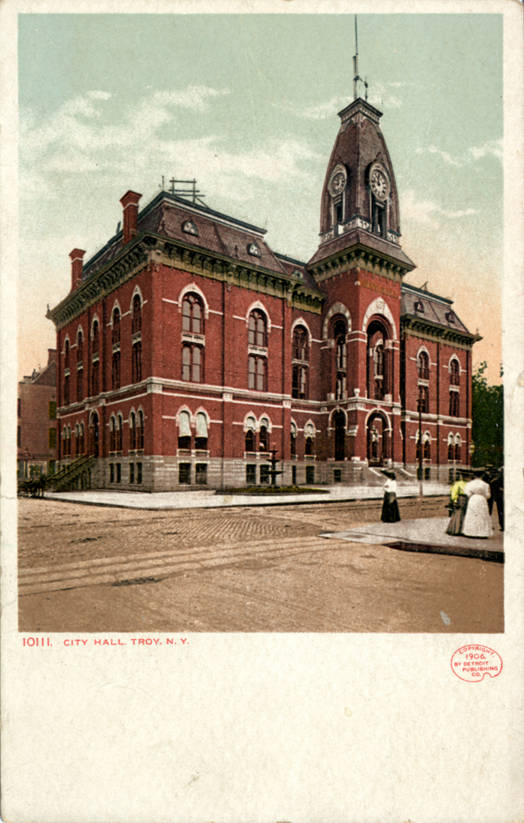
City hall building in Troy, New York (photo c.1900s)

- Albert Pawling, 1816-1820
- Esaias Warren, 1820-1828
- Samuel McCoun, 1828-1830
- George Tibbits, 1830-1836
- Richard P. Hart, 1836-1838
- Jonas C. Heartt, 1838-1843
- Gurdon Corning, 1843-1847
- Francis N. Mann, 1847-1850
- Day O. Kellogg, 1850
- Hanford N. Lockwood, 1850-1851
- Joseph M. Warren, 1851-1852
- George Gould, 1852-1853
- Foster Bosworth, 1853-1854
- Elias Plum, 1853-1854
- Jonathan Edwards, 1854-1855
- John A. Griswold, 1855-1856
- Hiram Slocum, 1856-1857
- Alfred Wotkyns, 1857-1858
- Arba Read, 1858-1860
- Isaac McConihe Jr., 1860-1861
- George B. Warren Jr., 1861-1862
- James Thorn, 1862-1863, 1864-1865
- William L. Van Alstyne, 1863-1864
- Uri Gilbert, 1865-1866, 1870-1871
- John L. Flagg, 1866-1868
- Miles Beach, 1868-1870
- Thomas B. Carroll, 1871-1873
- William Kemp, 1873-1875
- Edward Murphy Jr., 1875-1882
- Edmund Fitzgerald, 1882-1886
- Dennis J. Whelan, 1886-1894
- Francis J. Malloy, 1894-1900
- Daniel E. Conway, 1900-1903
- Joseph F. Hogan, 1904-1905
- Elias P. Mann, 1906-1912
- Cornelius F. Burns, 1912-1919, 1928-1936
- James W. Fleming, 1920-1921
- Harry E. Clinton, 1924-1928
- Cornelius F. Burns, 1928-1936
- Chester J. Atkinson, 1936-1938
- Frank Hogan, 1938-1944
- John J. Ahern, 1944-1950
- Edward A. "Dynamite" Fitzgerald, 1950-1956
- John J. Purcell, 1956-1960
- Neil W. Kelleher, 1960-1964
- Mark P. Pattison, 1996-2003
- Harry Tutunjian, 2004–2011
- Lou Rosamilia, c.2012-2015
- William Patrick Madden, 2016-2023
- Carmella Mantello, 2024-present

== See also ==
- History of Troy, New York
