= Martin H. Glynn =

American politician (1871–1924)

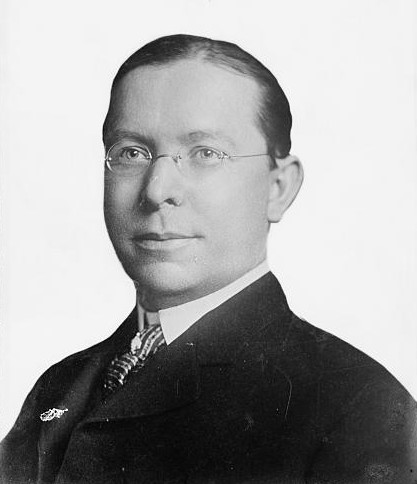
- Glynn in 1910

40th Governor of New York
- In office October 17, 1913 – December 31, 1914
- Lieutenant: Robert F. Wagner (acting)
- Preceded by: William Sulzer
- Succeeded by: Charles S. Whitman

Lieutenant Governor of New York
- In office January 1, 1913 – October 17, 1913
- Governor: William Sulzer
- Preceded by: Thomas F. Conway
- Succeeded by: Robert F. Wagner (acting)

39th Comptroller of New York
- In office January 1, 1907 – December 31, 1908
- Governor: Charles Evans Hughes
- Preceded by: William C. Wilson
- Succeeded by: Charles H. Gaus

Member of the U.S. House of Representatives from New York's 20th district
- In office March 4, 1899 – March 3, 1901
- Preceded by: George N. Southwick
- Succeeded by: George N. Southwick

Personal details
- Born: Martin Henry Glynn; September 27, 1871 Valatie, New York, U.S.
- Died: December 14, 1924 (aged 53) Albany, New York, U.S.
- Resting place: St. Agnes Cemetery, Menands, New York
- Party: Democratic
- Spouse: Mary McGrane
- Education: Fordham University (BA); Union University, New York (LLB)

Martin Henry Glynn (September 27, 1871 – December 14, 1924) was an American politician. He was the 40th governor of New York from 1913 to 1914, the first Irish American Roman Catholic head of government of what was then the most populated state of the United States. A Democrat, he signed a number of important reforms, including the direct primary and labor laws.

== Life ==
Glynn was born in Kinderhook, New York and grew up in Valatie, one of Kinderhook's villages. He was the son of Martin Glynn (son of Martin Glynn and Catherine de Burke) and Ann Scanlon, who were both born in Ireland.

He graduated from Fordham University in 1894, then studied at Albany Law School of Union University, New York, and was admitted to the bar in 1897. From 1896 on, he wrote for the Albany Times-Union daily newspaper, becoming eventually its editor, publisher and owner. In 1898, Fordham awarded Glynn the honorary degree of Master of Arts. Over the course of his career, Glynn received honorary LL.D. degrees from Fordham, Syracuse, Georgetown, and Union Universities.

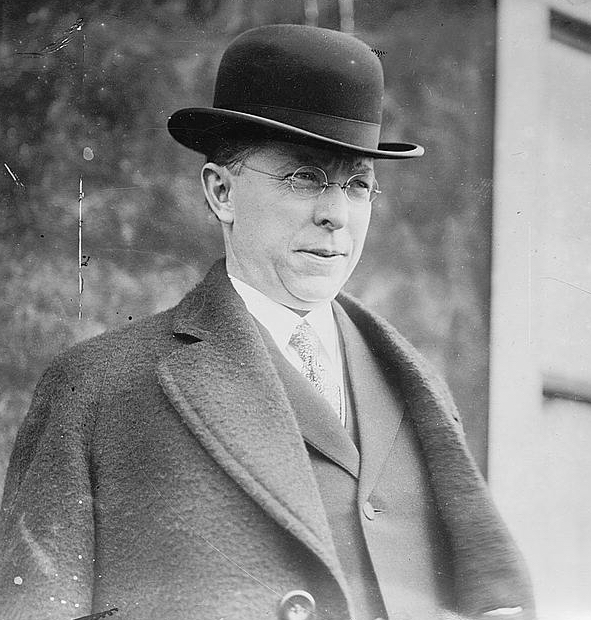
Glynn as a Congressman in 1901. Bain Collection, Library of Congress.

Glynn was elected as a Democrat to the 56th United States Congress, and served from March 4, 1899, to March 3, 1901. When he took his seat at age 26, Glynn was the youngest member of the House. He was New York State Comptroller from 1907 to 1908, elected in 1906, but defeated for re-election in 1908 by Republican Charles H. Gaus.

At the New York state election of 1912, Glynn was the running mate of the successful Democratic candidate for Governor, William Sulzer. Glynn was sworn in as Lieutenant Governor of New York on January 1. Following friction with the dominant Tammany Hall faction, Sulzer was impeached and in August 1913, Glynn was appointed Acting Governor. On October 17, following Sulzer's formal removal from office, Glynn was sworn in as Governor. He was the first Catholic Governor of New York and showed an interest in Irish-American affairs. However, Glynn was forced to manage conflict in his own party between Tammany Hall and reformers/progressives led by Sulzer, who became a critic of Glynn's administration. After a year in office Glynn was defeated at the 1914 election, by the Republican candidate, Charles S. Whitman. Sulzer was later active in the Progressive Party. Glynn was active in the progressive movement. David Sarasohn calls him "an able and progressive governor" who signed numerous reforms.

Glynn was a delegate to the 1916 and 1924 Democratic National Conventions. As the keynote speaker at the 1916 National Democratic Convention, Glynn delivered one of his most famous speeches, praising the accomplishments of President Woodrow Wilson and the platform of the Democratic Party.

== "The Crucifixion of Jews Must Stop!" ==
Glynn's article "The Crucifixion of Jews Must Stop!" was published in the October 31, 1919, issue of The American Hebrew; in it he lamented the poor conditions for European Jews after World War I. Glynn referred to these conditions as a potential "holocaust" and asserted that "six million Jewish men and women are starving across the seas". The figure of six million, which is also the generally accepted number of Jews who perished in The Holocaust of World War II has been exploited by Holocaust deniers. However, historian Robert N. Proctor says it "is simply a remarkable coincidence and nothing more."

== Death and burial ==
He committed suicide by gunshot in 1924, after having suffered throughout his adult life from chronic back pain caused by a spinal injury. Though the cause of death was listed on his death certificate, the local media reported that Glynn died of heart trouble. The true story of his death was publicized in Dominick Lizzi's 1994 biography. He was buried at St. Agnes Cemetery in Menands, New York.

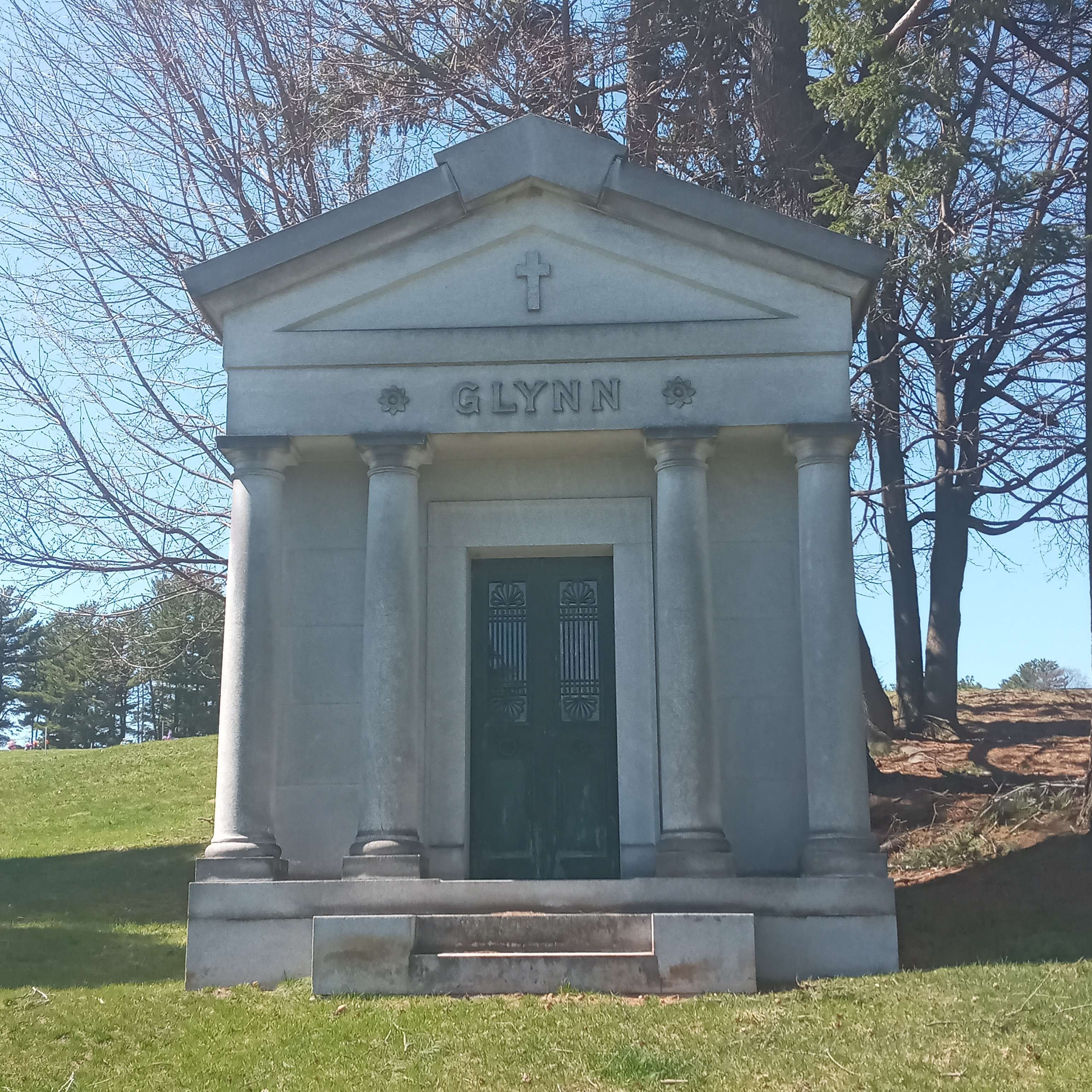
The gravesite of Governor Glynn

== Sources ==
- Glynn Ill in Germany, May Decline Office; Comptroller-elect Suffering from Injury to His Spine, New York Times, November 9, 1906
- Martin H. Glynn Biography at Valatie, New York Library
- Martin H. Glynn at Political Graveyard (gives as birthplace Kinderhook, the town which includes the Village of Valatie)
- Martin Henry Glynn Papers, 1913-1924 at the New York State Library

U.S. House of Representatives
Preceded by George N. Southwick	Member of the U.S. House of Representatives from New York's 20th congressional district 1899–1901	Succeeded by George N. Southwick
Political offices
Preceded by William C. Wilson	Comptroller of New York; 1907–1908	Succeeded by Charles H. Gaus
Preceded by Thomas F. Conway	Lieutenant Governor of New York; 1913	Succeeded by Robert F. Wagner; Acting
Preceded by William Sulzer	Governor of New York; 1913–1914	Succeeded by Charles S. Whitman
Party political offices
Preceded by George Hall	Democratic nominee for New York State Comptroller; 1906, 1908	Succeeded by William Sohmer
Preceded by Thomas F. Conway	Democratic nominee for Lieutenant Governor of New York; 1912	Succeeded by Thomas B. Lockwood
Preceded by William Sulzer	Democratic nominee for Governor of New York; 1914	Succeeded by Samuel Seabury
Preceded by Alton B. Parker	Keynote Speaker of the Democratic National Convention; 1916	Succeeded by Homer Cummings
