= James W. Fleming =

New York State Comptroller

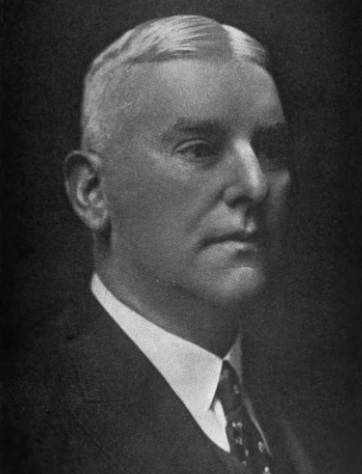
From the 1923 edition of The New York Red Book

James Wheeler Fleming (February 15, 1867, in Troy, Rensselaer County, New York – April 27, 1928, in Troy, Rensselaer County, New York) was an American businessman, banker and politician.

== Life ==
He was the son of James Fleming, a political lieutenant of Senator Edward Murphy Jr. The Flemings were in the wholesale liquor business, but James W. Fleming sold it after the death of his father. He attended Troy Academy, and graduated from Rensselaer Polytechnic Institute.

He was a director of the Manufacturers' National Bank of Troy, and of the Troy Gas Company. He was vice president of the Manhattan Navigation Company, and of the Casualty Company of America.

On June 15, 1911, he was appointed New York State Forest, Fish and Game Commissioner to replace Thomas Mott Osborne who had resigned. On July 17, 1911, he was appointed one of three commissioners of the New York State Conservation Commission, a body into which the Forest, Fish and Game Commission had been merged with the Water Supply Commission, the Forest Purchasing Board and the Black River Power Commission.

He was a delegate to the 1912, 1920 and 1924 Democratic National Conventions. He was Mayor of Troy, New York in 1920 and 1921. He was New York State Comptroller from 1923 to 1924, elected in 1922, but defeated for re-election in 1924 by Vincent B. Murphy.

== See also ==
- List of mayors of Troy, New York

== Sources ==
- Political Graveyard
- Appointed Forest, Fish and Game Commissioner, in NYT on June 16, 1911
- Appointed Conservation Commissioner, in NYT on July 18, 1911
- Obit in NYT on April 28, 1928 (subscription required)

Party political offices
Preceded by Charles W. Berry	Democratic nominee for New York State Comptroller; 1922, 1924	Succeeded by Morris S. Tremaine
Political offices
Preceded by William J. Maier	New York State Comptroller; 1923–1924	Succeeded by Vincent B. Murphy
