= Jonathan Edwards (numismatist) =

American physician and numismatist (1841–1886)

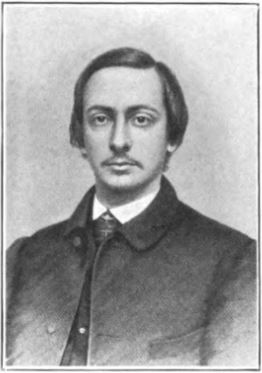
Jonathan Edwards

Jonathan Edwards (October 5, 1841 – June 19, 1886) was an American medical doctor and numismatist.

Edwards, the only son of Jonathan Edwards and Maria (Champion) Edwards, and a great-great-grandson of the famous theologian Jonathan Edwards, was born in Troy, N. Y., October 5, 1841. He was prepared for College in New Haven and graduated from Yale College in 1863. In January, 1864, he began the study of medicine in Troy. Later, he attended lectures in the Albany Medical College, and from October, 1865, to March, 1867, was a member of the College of Physicians and Surgeons, in New York City, from which institution at the latter date he received his medical diploma. The care of an invalid father then intervened, to prevent his entering on the practice of his profession. Removing to New Haven, he was closely occupied with this filial responsibility until death released him in 1875.

His residence continued in New Haven, and for several years he devoted much time and labor, gratuitously, to the care and increase of Yale's collection of coins. He had also formed a valuable collection of his own, and was well-versed in the study of the subject. A permanent evidence of his interest and generosity is shown in the Catalogue of Greek and Roman Coins in the Numismatic Collection of Yale College (New Haven, 1880. 236 pp. 8vo), which he edited with characteristic thoroughness, and which was printed largely at his own expense. Dr. Edwards also made extensive collections for a history of the Edwards family.

He was married, February 28, 1882, to Marion Collins, youngest daughter of the late David C. Collins, of New Haven, who survived him. After his marriage. Dr. Edwards and his wife spent a year in Europe, but he returned from abroad with his constitution undermined by Roman fever, and his general health quite shattered. The rest of his life was passed in increasing weakness in New Haven, where he died June 19, 1886, in the 45th year of his age.
