= James A. Wendell =

American politician from New York State (1869–1922)

James Augustus Wendell
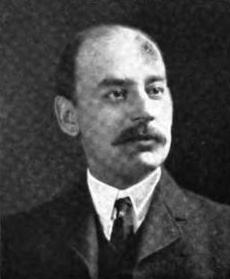

Comptroller of New York
- In office January 1, 1921 – May 10, 1922
- Governor: Nathan L. Miller
- Preceded by: Eugene M. Travis
- Succeeded by: William J. Maier

Personal details
- Born: January 1, 1869 Fort Plain, New York, U.S.
- Died: May 10, 1922 (aged 53) Albany, New York, U.S.

James Augustus Wendell (January 1, 1869 in Fort Plain, Montgomery County, New York – May 10, 1922 in Albany, Albany County, New York) was an American politician.

== Life ==
He studied law for a time, but did not finish. Instead, he worked as a clerk at the Fort Plain National Bank. In 1894 he entered the Comptroller's department and remained there for the rest of his life. For ten years he was Deputy Comptroller and in 1920 was elected New York State Comptroller on the Republican ticket. At the time, he was the first state cabinet officer who had been a career employee of his department.

In 1920, his predecessor Eugene M. Travis, Wendell and bond broker Albert L. Judson were indicted on charges of grand larceny. It was charged that Travis as Comptroller and Wendell as Deputy Comptroller had bought from Judson bonds at prices above the market for the State Sinking Fund, and so caused the loss of $230,000 for the State. The charges were dismissed in October 1921 because of lack of evidence to show criminal intent.

He died of apoplexy.

== Sources ==
- His father's obit in NYT on June 20, 1915
- The indictments, in NYT on December 30, 1920
- The impending prosecution, in NYT on April 7, 1921
- The trial continues, questions of jurisdiction, in NYT on June 28, 1921
- Charges dismissed, in NYT on October 7, 1921
- Obit in NYT on May 11, 1922

Party political offices
Preceded by Eugene M. Travis	Republican nominee for New York State Comptroller; 1920	Succeeded by William J. Maier
Political offices
Preceded by Eugene M. Travis	New York State Comptroller; 1921–1922	Succeeded by William J. Maier
