= Harry Tutunjian =

Mayor of Troy, New York
- In office 2004–2011
- Preceded by: Mark Pattison
- Succeeded by: Lou Rosamilia

City Council, At-Large
- In office 2002–2004

City Council, District 3
- In office 2000–2002
- Succeeded by: Art Judge

Personal details
- Party: Republican
- Spouse: Francesca Loporto

Harry J. Tutunjian was the Republican mayor of Troy, New York. He was elected in 2003 and re-elected in 2007. His term ended in 2012, when he could not seek reelection due to term limits. After being appointed for a position in the Rensselaer County Legislature, he lost an election for a full four-year term in 2012.

He holds a degree from Hudson Valley Community College.

== Political career ==
Tutunjian was elected to represent Troy's 3rd city council district in 1999, winning by just 24 votes. In 2001, he ran at-large, and was elected with the most votes, making him council president.

On November 5, 2003, Tutunjian was elected mayor of Troy, defeating Frank LaPosta, the endorsed Democratic candidate.

Tutunjian endorsed Carmella Mantello (R, C) in the 2011 general election for Troy mayor. Mantello was defeated by Lou Rosamilia (D) on November 8, 2011.

== See also ==
- List of mayors of Troy, New York
