= New York State Comptroller =

Chief financial officer of New York State

- Seal of the State of New York

- Flag of the State of New York

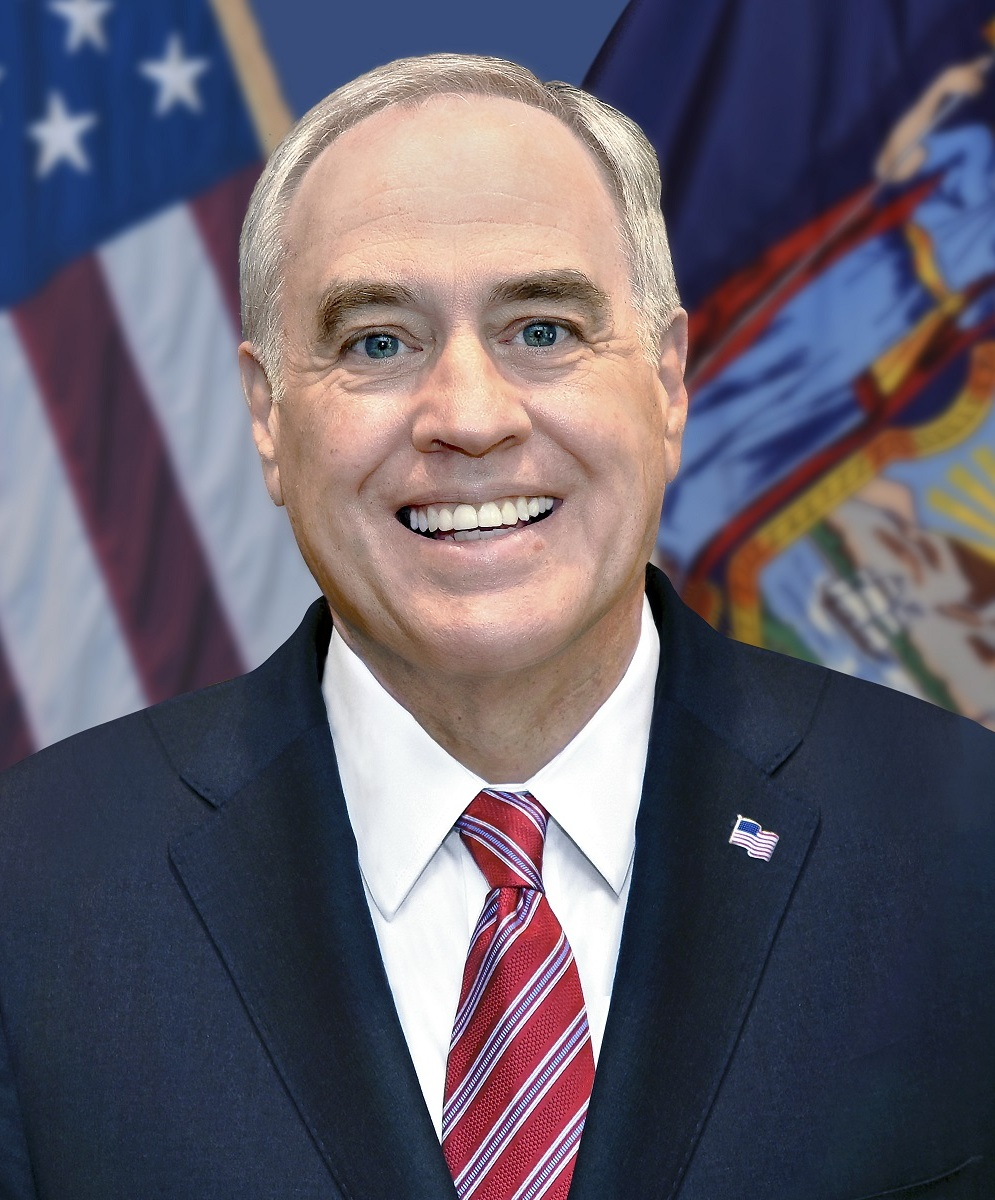
- Incumbent; Thomas DiNapoli since February 7, 2007
- Department of Audit and Control
- Style: Mr. or Madam Comptroller (informal); The Honorable (formal)
- Term length: Four years
- Constituting instrument: New York Constitution, Executive Law
- Formation: 1797
- First holder: Samuel Jones
- Succession: Fifth
- Salary: $210,000 (2019)
- Website: Official website

The New York state comptroller is an elected constitutional officer of the U.S. state of New York and head of the New York state government's Department of Audit and Control. Sixty-one individuals have held the office of State Comptroller since statehood. The incumbent is Thomas DiNapoli, a Democrat.

== Powers and duties ==
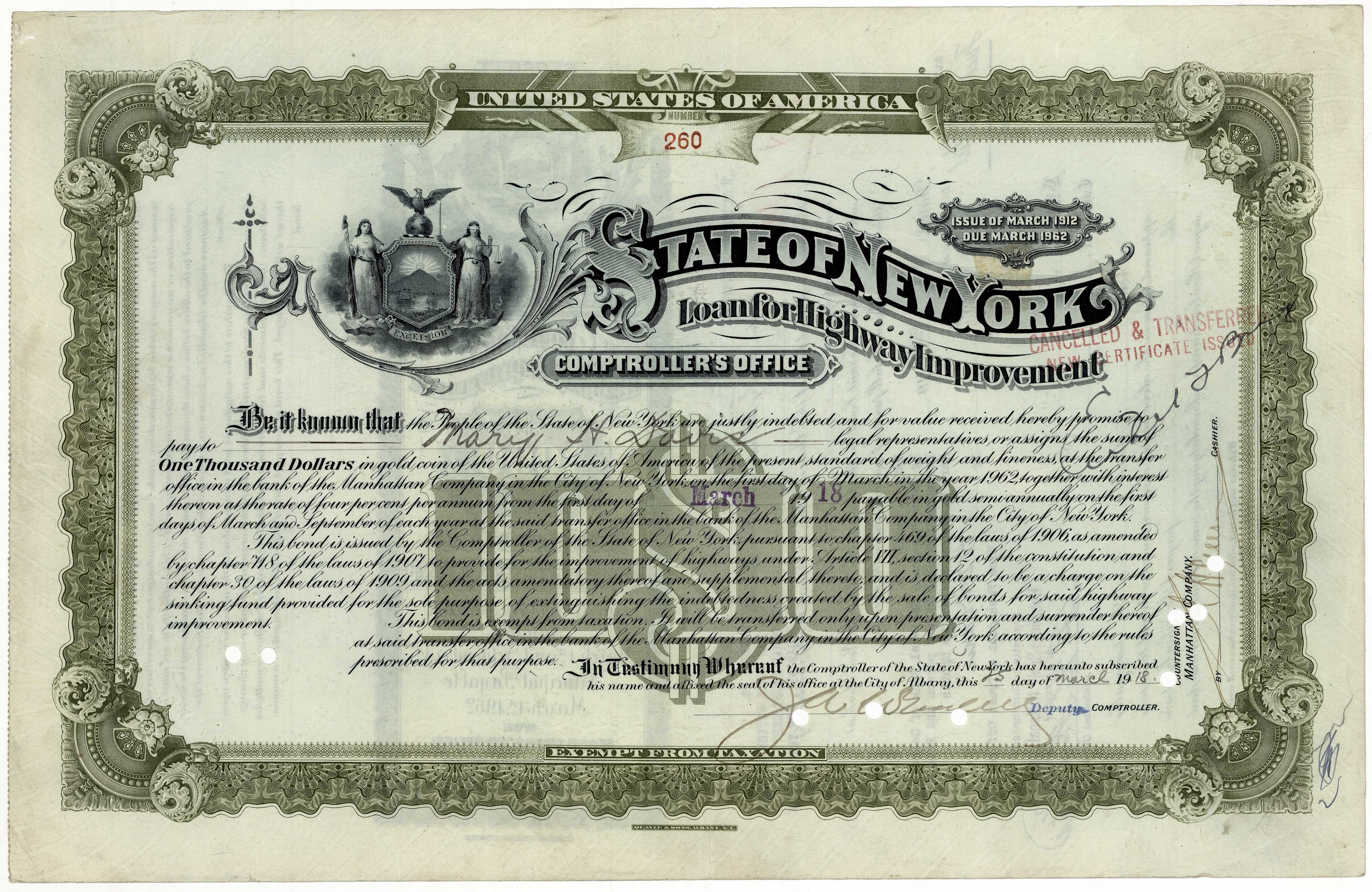
Loan for Highway Improvement, issued by the Comptroller's Office of the State of New York at the 25. March 1918.

The state comptroller is in effect New York's chief fiscal officer. Article V, Section 1, of the New York Constitution requires the state comptroller "to audit all vouchers before payment and all official accounts", "to audit the accrual and collection of all revenues and receipts", and "to prescribe such methods of accounting as are necessary for the performance of the foregoing duties". Furthermore, the State Constitution vests the safekeeping and protection of all state funds in the state comptroller, stating: "[t]he payment of any money of the state, or of any money under its control, or the refund of any money paid to the state, except upon audit by the comptroller, shall be void..." In accordance with this constitutional framework, the state comptroller has broad superintending authority unlike any other state auditor or treasurer in the nation to ensure that state agencies and local governments alike use taxpayer money effectively and efficiently to promote the common good. For example, the state comptroller:

1. Serves as sole trustee of the $267.36 billion New York State Common Retirement Fund (assets under management as of close of the 2024 fiscal year), making the State Comptroller and their Department of Audit and Control one of the largest institutional investors in the world;
2. Administers a statewide pension plan for public employees known as the New York State and Local Retirement System (NYSLRS). With over one million members, retirees and beneficiaries and more than 3,000 employers, NYSLRS is the largest such public pension system in the United States;
3. Prescribes and maintains the statewide accounting system and administers approximately $16.7 billion in payroll to state employees.
4. Issues reports disclosing the condition of state finances, including New York's annual comprehensive financial report;
5. Manages and issues the state debt;
6. Reviews state contracts for compliance with legal requirements and audits payments made by state agencies to vendors for goods or services procured;
7. Conducts financial, compliance, and performance audits of local governments, state agencies, and public benefit corporations;
8. Oversees the fiscal affairs of local governments, including New York City, and prescribes uniform systems of accounts, budgets, and financial reports therefor;
9. Investigates waste, fraud, and abuse of public resources;
10. Stewards the Justice Court Fund and the Oil Spill Fund;
11. Functions as custodian of more than $17 billion in unclaimed property, restoring lost accounts to their rightful owners; and
12. Supports local governments and state agencies with training seminars and technical assistance to improve their operations.

== History ==
In 1776, the New York Provincial Congress appointed an auditor-general to settle the public accounts. After his resignation, the Council of Appointment appointed an auditor to succeed. In 1797, the office of the state comptroller was created by the State Legislature to succeed the state auditor. The comptroller was appointed by the Council of Appointment to a one-year term, and could be re-appointed without term limit. In 1800, the Legislature reduced the salary of the comptroller from $3,000 to $2,500, and Samuel Jones declined to be re-appointed.

Under the Constitution of 1821, the comptroller was elected by joint ballot of the New York State Legislature to a three-year term. Under the Constitution of 1846, the office became elective by general election, and the comptroller was elected with the other state cabinet officers in odd years to a two-year term, serving in the second year of the governor in office and the first year of the succeeding governor. The comptroller was elected in 1895 to a three-year term, and subsequently the state officers were elected in even years and served a two-year term concurrently with the governor. In 1926, the responsibilities of the New York State Treasurer were transferred to the comptroller as the head of the Department of Audit and Control. Since 1938, the comptroller has been elected to a four-year term, like the governor.

== New York state comptrollers ==
Image	Name	Took office	Left office	Party	Notes
	Comfort Sands	July 24, 1776	March 23, 1782		as Auditor-General
	Peter T. Curtenius	April 2, 1782	1797		as Auditor
	Samuel Jones	March 15, 1797	March 12, 1800		
	John Vernon Henry	March 12, 1800	August 10, 1801	Federalist	
	Elisha Jenkins	August 10, 1801	March 16, 1806	Dem.-Rep.	appointed Secretary of State
	Archibald McIntyre	March 26, 1806	February 12, 1821	Dem.-Rep./Clintonian	
	John Savage	February 12, 1821	January 29, 1823	Dem.-Rep.	appointed Chief Justice of the New York Supreme Court
	William L. Marcy	February 13, 1823	January 21, 1829	Dem.-Rep./Bucktail	appointed to the New York Supreme Court shortly before the end of his second term
	Silas Wright	January 27, 1829	January 7, 1833	Democratic	elected a U.S. Senator from New York during his second term
	Azariah C. Flagg	January 11, 1833	February 4, 1839	Democratic	two terms
	Bates Cooke	February 4, 1839	January 1841	Whig	resigned because of bad health
	John A. Collier	January 27, 1841	February 7, 1842	Whig	elected to a term of three years, but in 1842 all Whig state officers were removed by Democratic majority of the State Legislature
	Azariah C. Flagg	February 7, 1842	December 31, 1847	Democratic	two terms, legislated out of office by the Constitution of 1846
	Millard Fillmore	January 1, 1848	February 20, 1849	Whig	first Comptroller elected by general ballot; went on to be U.S. Vice President and President
	Washington Hunt	February 20, 1849	December 18, 1850	Whig	elected by the State Legislature to fill unexpired term, then re-elected, then elected Governor of New York
	Philo C. Fuller	December 18, 1850	December 31, 1851	Whig	appointed to fill unexpired term
	John C. Wright	January 1, 1852	December 31, 1853	Democratic	
	James M. Cook	January 1, 1854	December 31, 1855	Whig	
	Lorenzo Burrows	January 1, 1856	December 31, 1857	American	
	Sanford E. Church	January 1, 1858	December 31, 1859	Democratic	
	Robert Denniston	January 1, 1860	December 31, 1861	Republican	
	Lucius Robinson	January 1, 1862	December 31, 1865	Union	two terms
	Thomas Hillhouse	January 1, 1866	December 31, 1867	Republican	
	William F. Allen	January 1, 1868	July 1, 1870	Democratic	elected a judge of the New York Court of Appeals
	Asher P. Nichols	July 1, 1870	December 31, 1871	Democratic	appointed to fill unexpired term, elected for the remainder of the term in Nov. 1870
	Nelson K. Hopkins	January 1, 1872	December 31, 1875	Republican	two terms
	Lucius Robinson	January 1, 1876	December 31, 1876	Democratic	elected Governor of New York
	Frederic P. Olcott	January 1, 1877	December 31, 1879	Democratic	appointed to fill unexpired term, then elected for a full term in Nov. 1877
	James W. Wadsworth	January 1, 1880	December 31, 1881	Republican	
	Ira Davenport	January 1, 1882	December 31, 1883	Republican	
	Alfred C. Chapin	January 1, 1884	December 31, 1887	Democratic	two terms
	Edward Wemple	January 1, 1888	December 31, 1891	Democratic	two terms
	Frank Campbell	January 1, 1892	December 31, 1893	Democratic	
	James A. Roberts	January 1, 1894	December 31, 1898	Republican	two terms (1894–95, 1896–98)
	William J. Morgan	January 1, 1899	September 5, 1900	Republican	died in office
	Theodore P. Gilman	September 5, 1900	December 31, 1900	Republican	as First Deputy Comptroller acted until being appointed to fill unexpired term
	Erastus C. Knight	January 1, 1901	December 28, 1901	Republican	elected Mayor of Buffalo
	Nathan L. Miller	December 30, 1901	November 1903	Republican	appointed to fill unexpired term, then elected for a full term in Nov. 1902, then resigned to take office as a justice of the New York Supreme Court
	Otto Kelsey	November 12, 1903	May 2, 1906	Republican	appointed to fill unexpired term, then elected for a full term in Nov. 1904, then appointed Superintendent of Insurance
	William C. Wilson	May 2, 1906	December 31, 1906	Republican	as First Deputy Comptroller acted until being appointed on November 8 to fill unexpired term
	Martin H. Glynn	January 1, 1907	December 31, 1908	Democratic	
	Charles H. Gaus	January 1, 1909	October 31, 1909	Republican	died in office
	Otto Kelsey	October 31, 1909	November 11, 1909	Republican	as First Deputy Comptroller acted until the appointment of a successor
	Clark Williams	November 11, 1909	December 31, 1910	Republican	appointed to fill unexpired term
	William Sohmer	January 1, 1911	December 31, 1914	Democratic	two terms
	Eugene M. Travis	January 1, 1915	December 31, 1920	Republican	three terms
	James A. Wendell	January 1, 1921	May 10, 1922	Republican	died in office
	William J. Maier	May 10, 1922	December 31, 1922	Republican	as First Deputy Comptroller acted until being appointed on May 22 to fill unexpired term
	James W. Fleming	January 1, 1923	December 31, 1924	Democratic	
	Vincent B. Murphy	January 1, 1925	December 31, 1926	Republican	
	Morris S. Tremaine	January 1, 1927	October 12, 1941	Democratic	seven terms, died in office
	Harry D. Yates	October 12, 1941	October 17, 1941	Democratic	as First Deputy Comptroller acted until the appointment of a successor
	Joseph V. O'Leary	October 17, 1941	December 31, 1942	American Labor	appointed to fill unexpired term
	Frank C. Moore	January 1, 1943	December 31, 1950	Republican	two terms
	J. Raymond McGovern	January 1, 1951	December 31, 1954	Republican	
	Arthur Levitt Sr.	January 1, 1955	December 31, 1978	Democratic	six terms, longest-serving Comptroller (24 years)
	Edward Regan	January 1, 1979	May 7, 1993	Republican	resigned in the middle of his fourth term
	Carl McCall	May 7, 1993	December 31, 2002	Democratic	elected by State Legislature to fill unexpired term, then re-elected twice
	Alan Hevesi	January 1, 2003	December 22, 2006	Democratic	re-elected to a second term, but resigned prior to its commencement
	Thomas Sanzillo	December 22, 2006	February 7, 2007		as First Deputy Comptroller acted until the election of a successor by the State Legislature
	Thomas DiNapoli	February 7, 2007	present	Democratic	elected by the State Legislature to fill unexpired term, then re-elected four times

== See also ==
- New York State Authorities Budget Office
- New York Comptroller election, 2006
- New York Comptroller elections
- New York State Financial Control Board
- New York State Public Authorities Control Board
