= Eugene M. Travis =

American politician

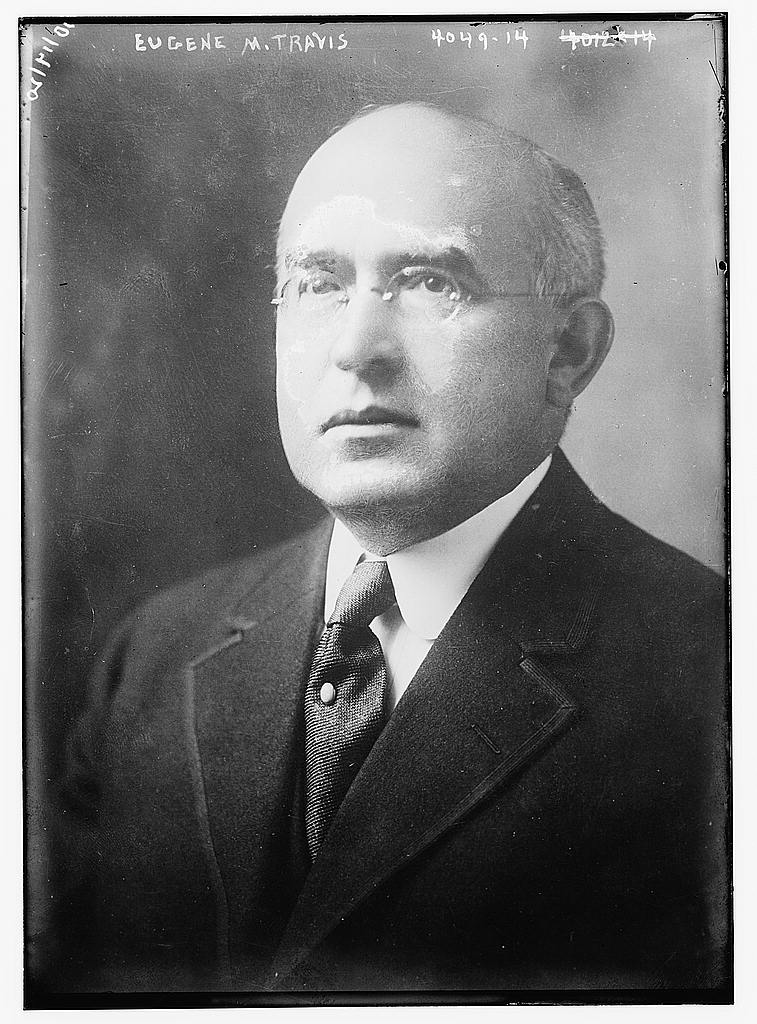
Eugene Mabbett Travis circa 1915

Eugene Mabbett Travis (June 10, 1863 in Brooklyn, Kings County, New York – July 25, 1940 in Brooklyn, New York City) was an American businessman and politician from New York. He was New York State Comptroller from 1915 to 1920.

== Life ==
In 1884, he married Fannie Bell Peck (b. 1863).

He was a Republican member of the New York State Senate (6th D.) from 1907 to 1912, sitting in the 130th, 131st, 132nd, 133rd, 134th and 135th New York State Legislatures. He was New York State Comptroller from 1915 to 1920, elected in 1914, 1916 and 1918.

In 1921, Travis, his successor James A. Wendell and bond broker Albert L. Judson were indicted on charges of grand larceny. It was charged that Travis as Comptroller and Wendell as Deputy Comptroller had bought from Judson bonds at prices above the market for the State Sinking Fund, and so caused the loss of $230,000 for the State. The charges were later dismissed because of lack of evidence to show criminal intent.

He died at his home at 436 Grand Avenue, Brooklyn.

== Sources ==
- Cut off the primary ticket, in NYT on August 21, 1918
- Back on the primary ticket, in NYT on August 24, 1918
- The indictments, in NYT on December 30, 1920
- The impending prosecution, in NYT on April 7, 1921
- The trial continues, questions of jurisdiction, in NYT on June 28, 1921
- Charges dismissed, in NYT on October 7, 1921
- Obit in NYT on July 27, 1940 (subscription required)

Party political offices
Preceded by William D. Cunningham	Republican nominee for New York State Comptroller; 1914, 1916, 1918	Succeeded by James A. Wendell
New York State Senate
Preceded by Frank J. Gardner	New York State Senate; 6th District; 1907–1912	Succeeded by William B. Carswell
Political offices
Preceded by William Sohmer	New York State Comptroller; 1915–1920	Succeeded by James A. Wendell
