= Jonathan Edwards (luger) =

American luger (born 1972)

Jonathan Edwards (born March 28, 1972, in Boston, Massachusetts) is an American luger who competed in the early 1990s. He finished fourth in the men's doubles event at the 1994 Winter Olympics in Lillehammer.

In 2018 he published his first book.

Edwards today lives between Calgary, Alberta Canada and the Boston, Massachusetts area.
