= Charles H. Gaus =

American politician (1840–1909)

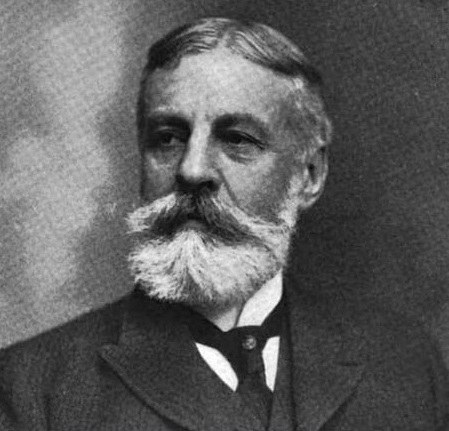

Charles Henry Gaus (September 1, 1840 in Zanesville, Muskingum County, Ohio – October 31, 1909 in the Laurentian Mountains, Quebec, Canada) was an American businessman and politician.

== Life ==
He was born of German parents in Ohio, but the family moved to Brooklyn, New York when he was two years old. In 1857 he went to Albany, New York, and worked at his uncle's drugstore. He fought in the American Civil War. In 1874, he opened his own drugstore on the corner of Washington Ave. and Lark St. in Albany.

Gaus was an expert marksman, winning the Wimbledon Cup in 1889, 1890, 1891 and 1892.

In Albany, he was at times a supervisor, School Commissioner, City Street Commissioner and City Assessor, and was Mayor from 1902 to 1908. He was New York State Comptroller from January 1, 1909, until his death, elected in 1908 on the Republican ticket. He was ill most of the time, and First Deputy Comptroller Otto Kelsey actually ran the office.

Gaus died from pneumonia during a vacation at a hunting lodge on the preserve of the Bourbinnais-Kiamika Club on Long Lake in the Laurentian Mountains. He was buried at Albany Rural Cemetery.

== Sources ==
- Obit in NYT, on November 1, 1909
- The Political Graveyard: Index to Politicians: Gatesman to Gayheart at politicalgraveyard.com Political Graveyard

Party political offices
Preceded by Merton E. Lewis	Republican nominee for New York State Comptroller; 1908	Succeeded by James Thompson
Political offices
Preceded by James H. Blessing	Mayor of Albany, New York; 1902–1908	Succeeded by Henry F. Snyder
Preceded by Martin H. Glynn	New York State Comptroller; 1909	Succeeded by Otto Kelsey; Acting
