= Jonathan Edwards (New York politician) =

American politician

Jonathan Edwards (September 27, 1798 – August 23, 1875) was an American lawyer and politician. He was the mayor of Troy, New York, and was a representative to the New York State Legislature.

== Early life ==
Edwards was born in Hartford, Connecticut, Sept. 27, 1798, and was the eldest son of Jonathan Walter Edwards (1772-1831), a distinguished lawyer of Hartford, son of the theologian Jonathan Edwards (1745-1801) and grandson of the famed American theologian and revivalist preacher Jonathan Edwards (1745–1801). His mother was Elizabeth Tyron Edwards, daughter of Capt. Moses Tryon, of Wethersfield, Connecticut.

== Career ==
He graduated from Yale College in 1819. After leaving college, he studied law with Chief Justice Zephaniah Swift, of Windham, Connecticut, and was admitted to the bar in 1824, and was for a few years a practicing attorney in Hartford. In 1830 he went to the island of Cuba to reside, but the death of his father in April, 1831, changed his plans, and caused him to return to Hartford. In 1835 he was appointed by the Connecticut State Legislature a judge of probate for the district of Hartford, and held that office for one year. In 1830 he was nominated by the Whigs for secretary of state, but was defeated, with all his associates on the ticket. He moved in 1838 to Troy, New York, where he was subsequently mayor of the city, and for two years (1854 and 1855) a member of the New York State Legislature.

== Personal life and death ==
He was married, March 1, 1837, to Maria Champion, of Colchester, Connecticut. Alter her death he moved in the spring of 1867 with his son to New Haven, Connecticut, where he spent the remainder of his life in invalid retirement.

He died in New Haven on August 23, 1875, aged 77. The cause of death was a congestive chill. His only son graduated from Yale in 1863.

== See also ==
- List of mayors of Troy, New York
