= Jerome H. Wheelock =

American politician

Jerome Hugo Wheelock (June 30, 1877 – March 8, 1966) was an American educator and politician.

Born near Harriville in the town of Harris in Marquette County, Wisconsin, Wheelock went to Westfield High School in Westfield, Wisconsin, and then graduated from Stevens Point Normal School (now University of Wisconsin–Stevens Point. He was the principal of Westfield High School and later served as superintendent of schools for Marquette County. He then became principal of the Waushara County Normal School and later the Taylor County Normal School. Wheelock also served on the high school boards in Medford, Wisconsin and in Westfield, Wisconsin. Wheelock was the president of the Vernon County, Wisconsin Normal School and was president of the school board in Viroqua, Wisconsin. While he was living in Viroqua, Wheelock was elected to the Wisconsin State Assembly in 1943 and 1945 as a Republican. During World War II, Wheelock was the Sugar Rationing Administrator for Vernon County. In 1965, Wheelock and his wife moved to Richland Center, Wisconsin, where he subsequently died in a hospital.
