= Princeton Board of Education =

Princeton Board of Education may refer to:

- Princeton City Schools (Ohio)
- Princeton School District (Wisconsin)
- Princeton Public Schools (New Jersey)
