= Harris, Wisconsin =

- Town
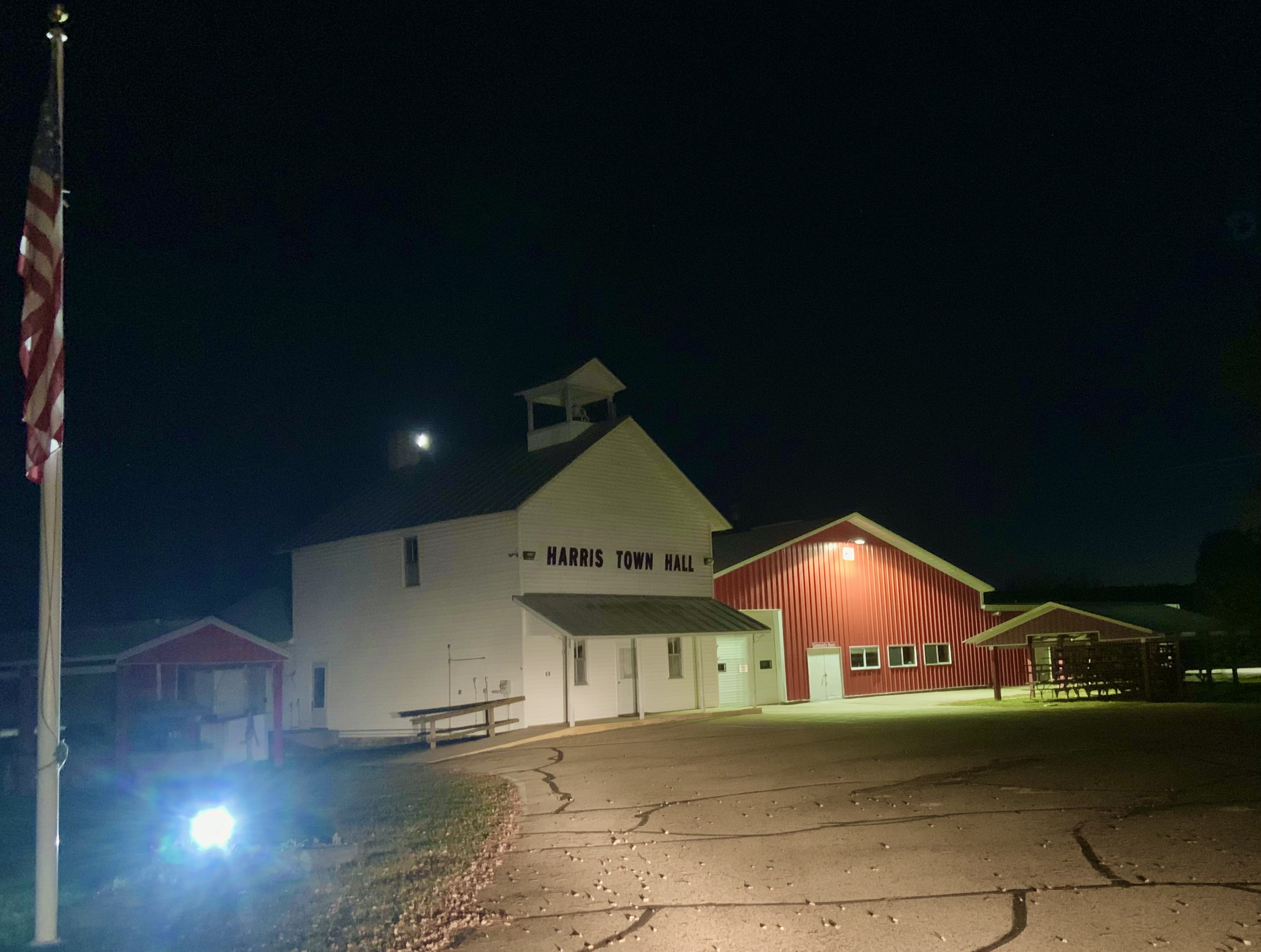
- Town hall

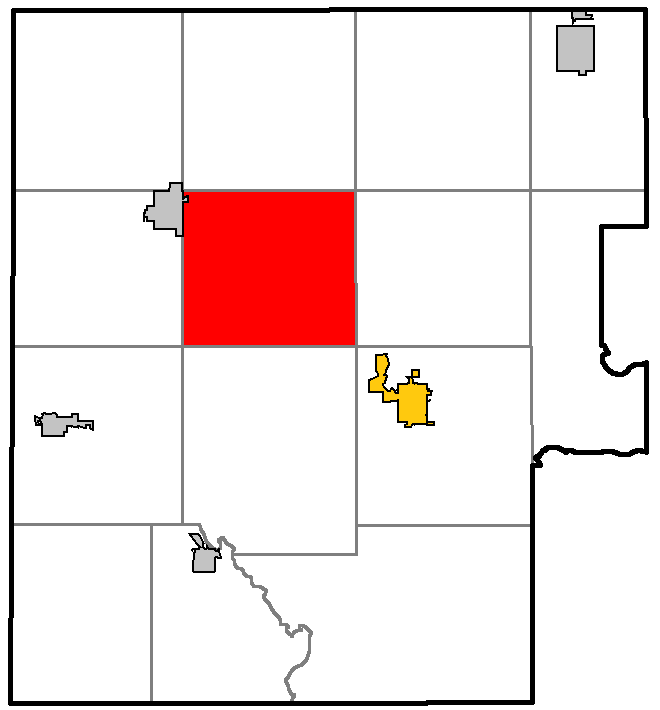
- Location of Harris, Marquette County, Wisconsin

- Location of Marquette County, Wisconsin
- Coordinates: 43°52′10″N 89°25′24″W
- Country: United States
- State: Wisconsin
- County: Marquette

Area
  - Total: 30.9 sq mi (80.0 km^{2})
  - Land: 30.6 sq mi (79.2 km^{2})
  - Water: 0.27 sq mi (0.7 km^{2})
- Elevation: 873 ft (266 m)

Population (2020)
  - Total: 748
  - Density: 24.5/sq mi (9.44/km^{2})
- Time zone: UTC-6 (Central (CST))
  - Summer (DST): UTC-5 (CDT)
- FIPS code: 55-32775
- GNIS feature ID: 1583353
- Website: https://townofharriswi.com/

Harris is a town located in Marquette County, Wisconsin, United States. According to the 2020 census, the town had a total population of 748. The census-designated place of Harrisville is located in the town. Both the community and the town were named for James Harris, who became the first postmaster when the community's post office opened in March 1851. The village of Westfield is adjacent to the town.

== Geography ==
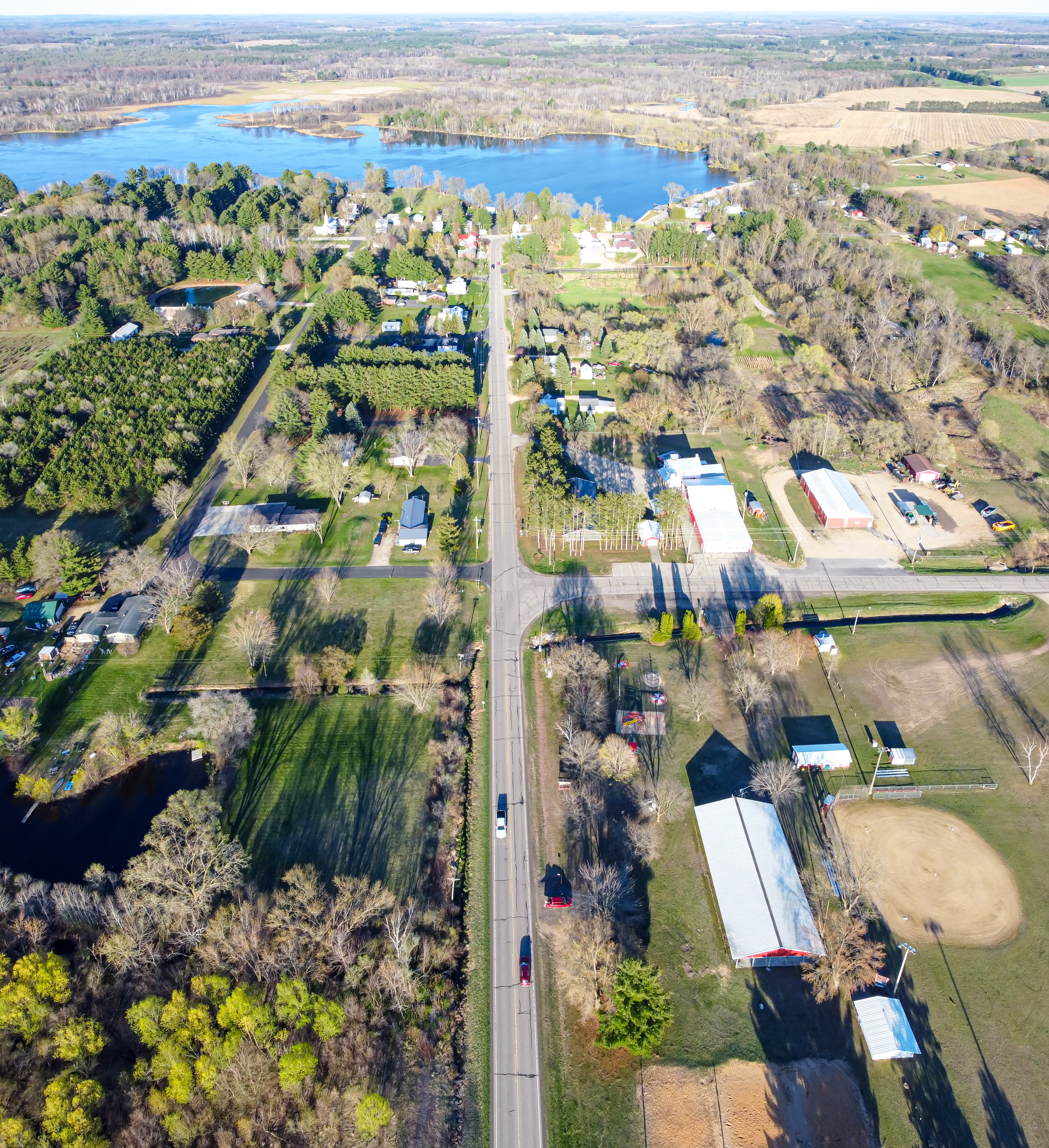

According to the United States Census Bureau, the town has a total area of 30.9 square miles (80.0 km^{2}) of which 30.6 square miles (79.2 km^{2}) is land and 0.3 square miles (0.8 km^{2}) is water. The total area is 0.94% water.

== Demographics ==
At the 2000 census, there were 729 people, 294 households, and 211 families residing in the town. The population density was 23.8 per square mile (9.2/km^{2}). There were 359 housing units at an average density of 11.7 per square mile (4.5/km^{2}). The racial makeup of the town was 98.08% White, 0.27% African American, 0.14% Native American, 0.14% Asian, 0.41% Pacific Islander, 0.27% from other races, and 0.69% from two or more races. 1.78% of the population were Hispanic or Latino of any race.

There were 294 households, of which 28.2% had children under the age of 18 living with them, 63.9% were married couples living together, 5.4% had a female householder with no husband present, and 28.2% were non-families. 22.1% of all households were made up of individuals, and 10.2% had someone living alone who was 65 years of age or older. The average household size was 2.48 and the average family size was 2.89.

22.6% of the population were under the age of 18, 7.1% from 18 to 24, 22.6% from 25 to 44, 29.2% from 45 to 64, and 18.4% who were 65 years of age or older. The median age was 43 years. For every 100 females, there were 101.4 males. For every 100 females age 18 and over, there were 101.4 males.

The median household income was $37,344, and the median family income was $43,250. Males had a median income of $30,074 versus $25,313 for females. The per capita income for the town was $18,686. 4.4% of the population and 2.9% of families were below the poverty line. Out of the total population, 1.8% of those under the age of 18 and 7.2% of those 65 and older were living below the poverty line.

== Education ==
It is part of the Westfield School District.

== Notable people ==
- Jerome H. Wheelock, Wisconsin State Representative and educator, was born in the town
