= Neshkoro (town), Wisconsin =

Neshkoro, Wisconsin
- Town
- Town of Neshkoro
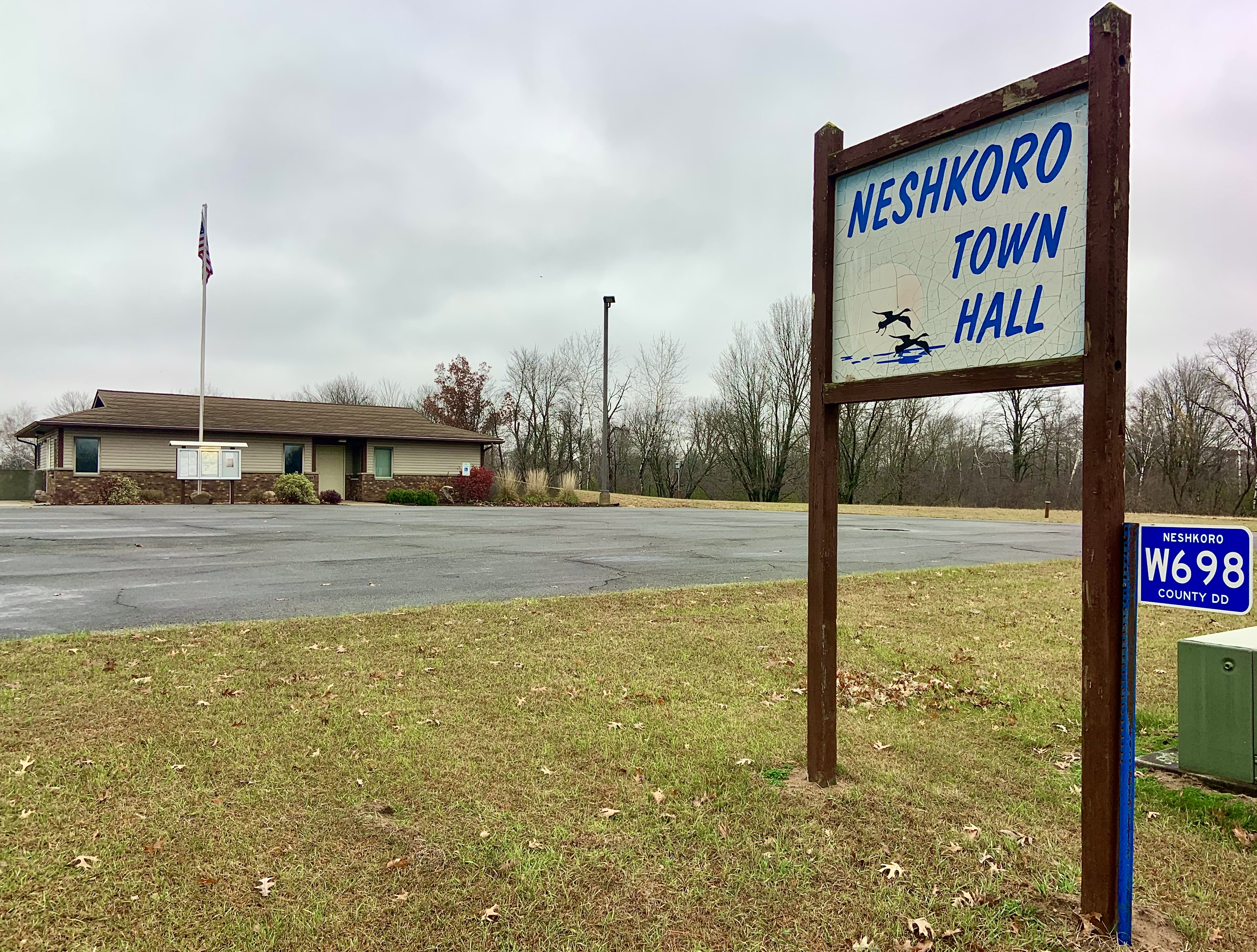
- Neshkoro Town Hall

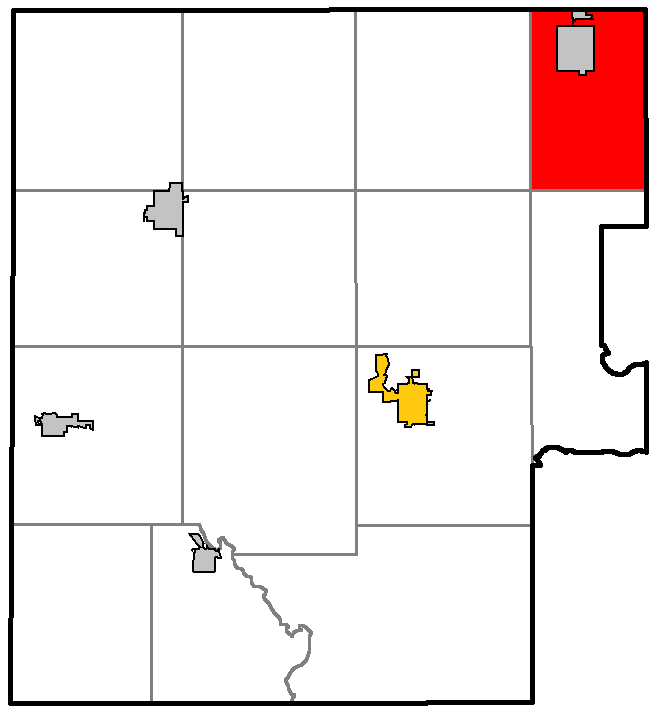
- Location of Neshkoro, within Marquette County, Wisconsin

- Location of Marquette County, Wisconsin
- Coordinates: 43°55′58″N 89°12′29″W
- Country: United States
- State: Wisconsin
- County: Marquette

Area
  - Total: 21.80 sq mi (56.5 km^{2})
  - Land: 21.46 sq mi (55.6 km^{2})
  - Water: 0.34 sq mi (0.88 km^{2})

Population (2020)
  - Total: 565
  - Density: 26.3/sq mi (10.2/km^{2})
- Time zone: UTC-6 (Central (CST))
  - Summer (DST): UTC-5 (CDT)
- Area code(s): 920 and 274
- GNIS feature ID: 1583795
- Website: https://townofneshkoro.org/

Neshkoro is a town in Marquette County, Wisconsin, United States. The population was 565 at the 2020 census. The Village of Neshkoro is located within the town.

== Geography ==
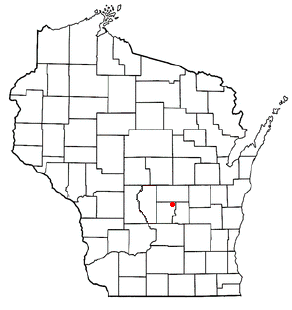
Location of Neshkoro (town), Wisconsin

According to the United States Census Bureau, the town has a total area of 21.2 square miles (55.0 km^{2}), of which 20.9 square miles (54.1 km^{2}) is land and 0.3 square mile (0.9 km^{2} (1.65%) is water.

== Demographics ==
As of the census of 2000, there were 595 people, 258 households, and 197 families residing in the town. The population density was 28.5 people per square mile (11.0/km^{2}). There were 486 housing units at an average density of 23.3 per square mile (9.0/km^{2}). The racial makeup of the town was 98.82% White, 0.17% Black or African American, 0.17% Native American, and 0.84% from two or more races. 0.34% of the population were Hispanic or Latino of any race.

There were 258 households, out of which 22.1% had children under the age of 18 living with them, 70.9% were married couples living together, 3.5% had a female householder with no husband present, and 23.3% were non-families. 19.4% of all households were made up of individuals, and 10.9% had someone living alone who was 65 years of age or older. The average household size was 2.31 and the average family size was 2.63.

In the town, the population was spread out, with 18.0% under the age of 18, 4.2% from 18 to 24, 21.2% from 25 to 44, 31.9% from 45 to 64, and 24.7% who were 65 years of age or older. The median age was 50 years. For every 100 females, there were 99.7 males. For every 100 females age 18 and over, there were 99.2 males.

The median income for a household in the town was $36,125, and the median income for a family was $40,156. Males had a median income of $36,417 versus $22,813 for females. The per capita income for the town was $18,518. About 6.1% of families and 8.0% of the population were below the poverty line, including 10.6% of those under age 18 and 10.5% of those age 65 or over.

== Education ==
The northern part of the town is in Westfield School District while the southern part is in the Princeton School District.
