= Budsin, Wisconsin =

- Unincorporated community
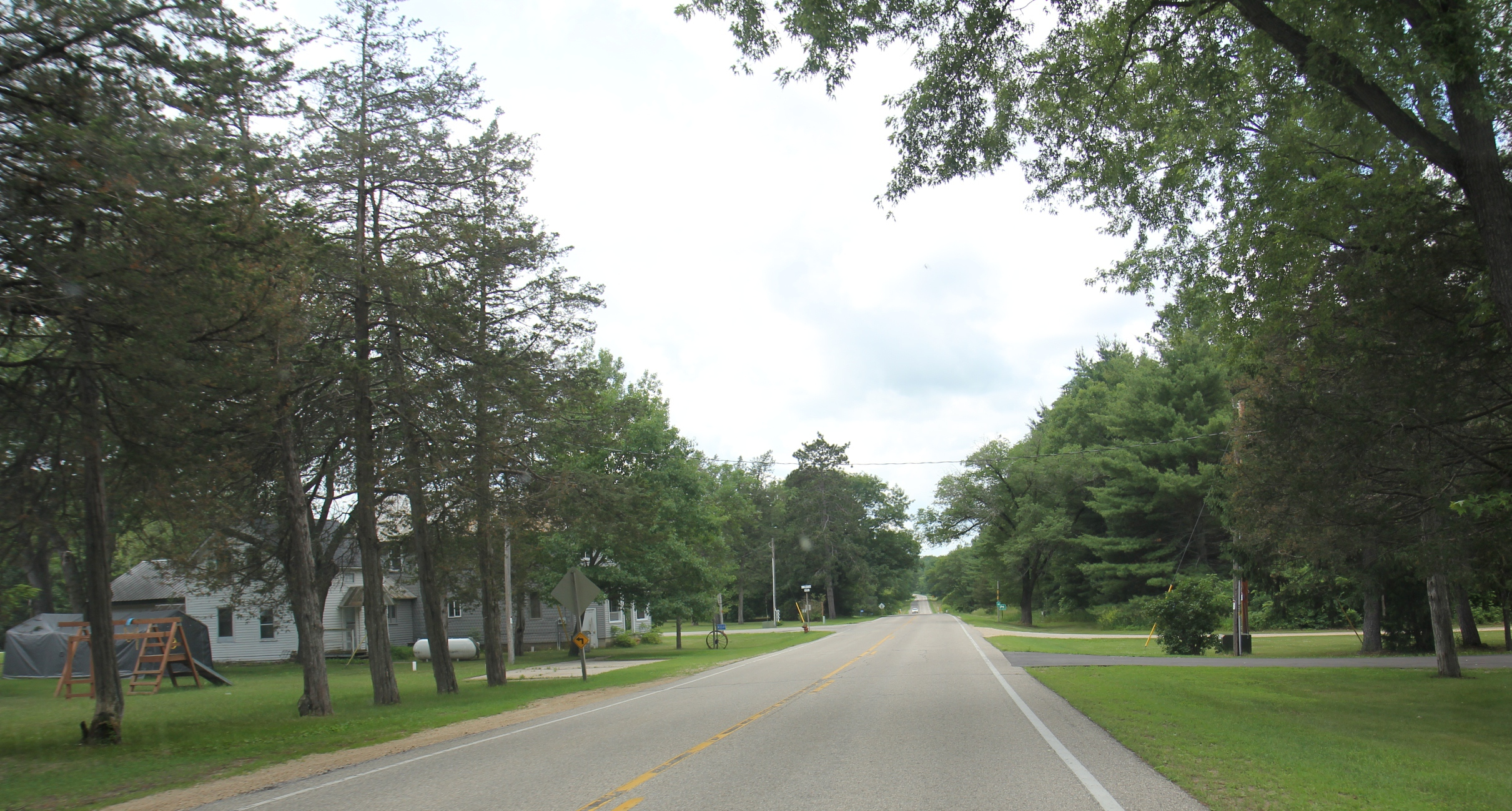
- Budsin in 2014

- Location within Wisconsin Location within the United States
- Coordinates: 43°55′10″N 89°18′43″W
- Country: United States
- State: Wisconsin
- County: Marquette
- Elevation: 820 ft (250 m)
- Time zone: UTC-6 (Central (CST))
  - Summer (DST): UTC-5 (CDT)
- Zip: 53921
- Area code: 920
- GNIS feature ID: 1562348

Budsin is an unincorporated community in the Town of Crystal Lake in Marquette County, Wisconsin, United States, centered on the junction of County Trunk Highway E and Wisconsin Highway 22.

== Notable people ==
- Martin E. Schreiber, Wisconsin State Representative and Milwaukee alderman, was born in Budsin; he was the father of a governor of Wisconsin Martin J. Schreiber.

== Images ==
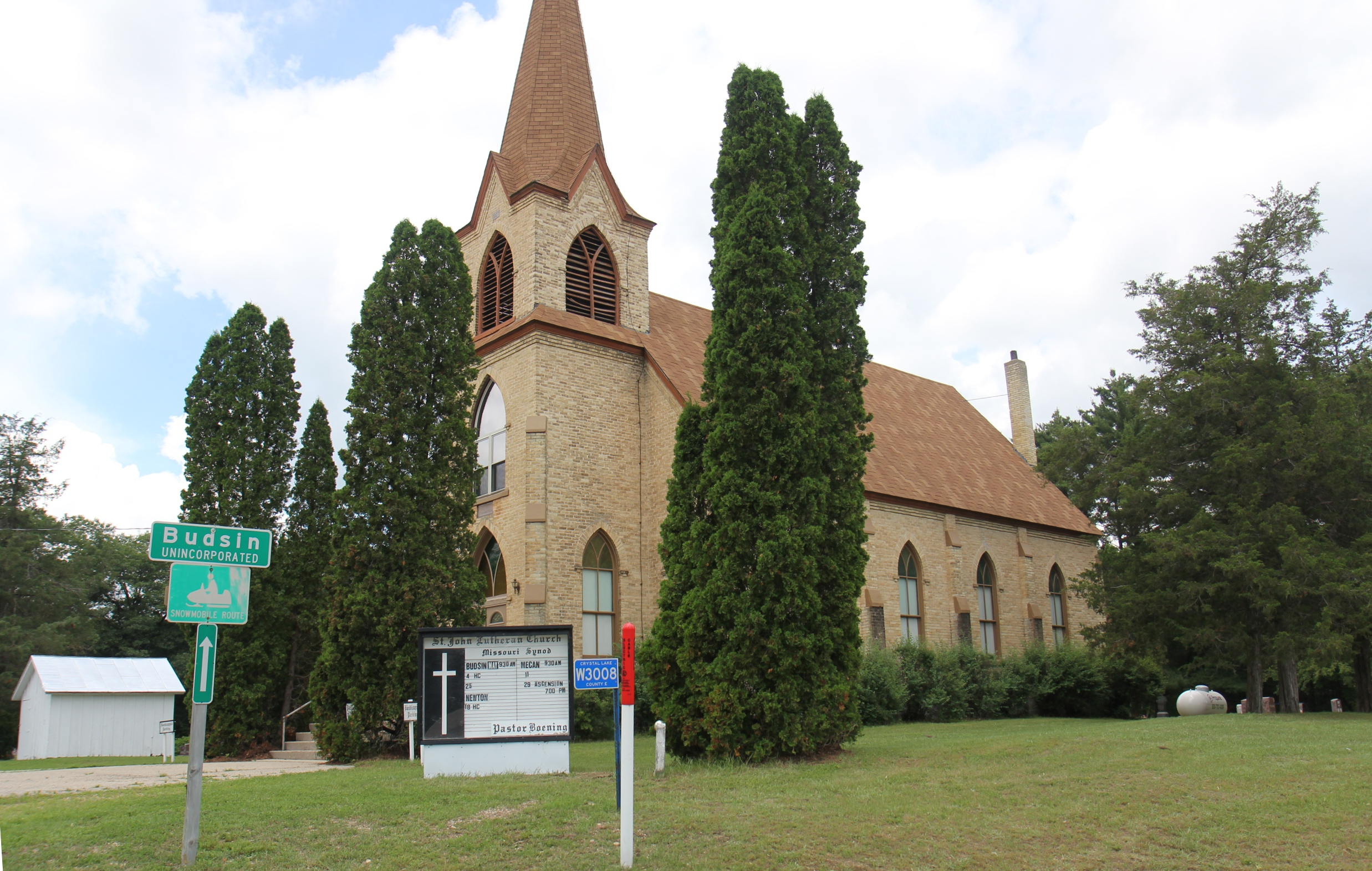
Budsin sign and St. John Lutheran Church
