= Princeton (town), Wisconsin =

Princeton, Wisconsin
- Town
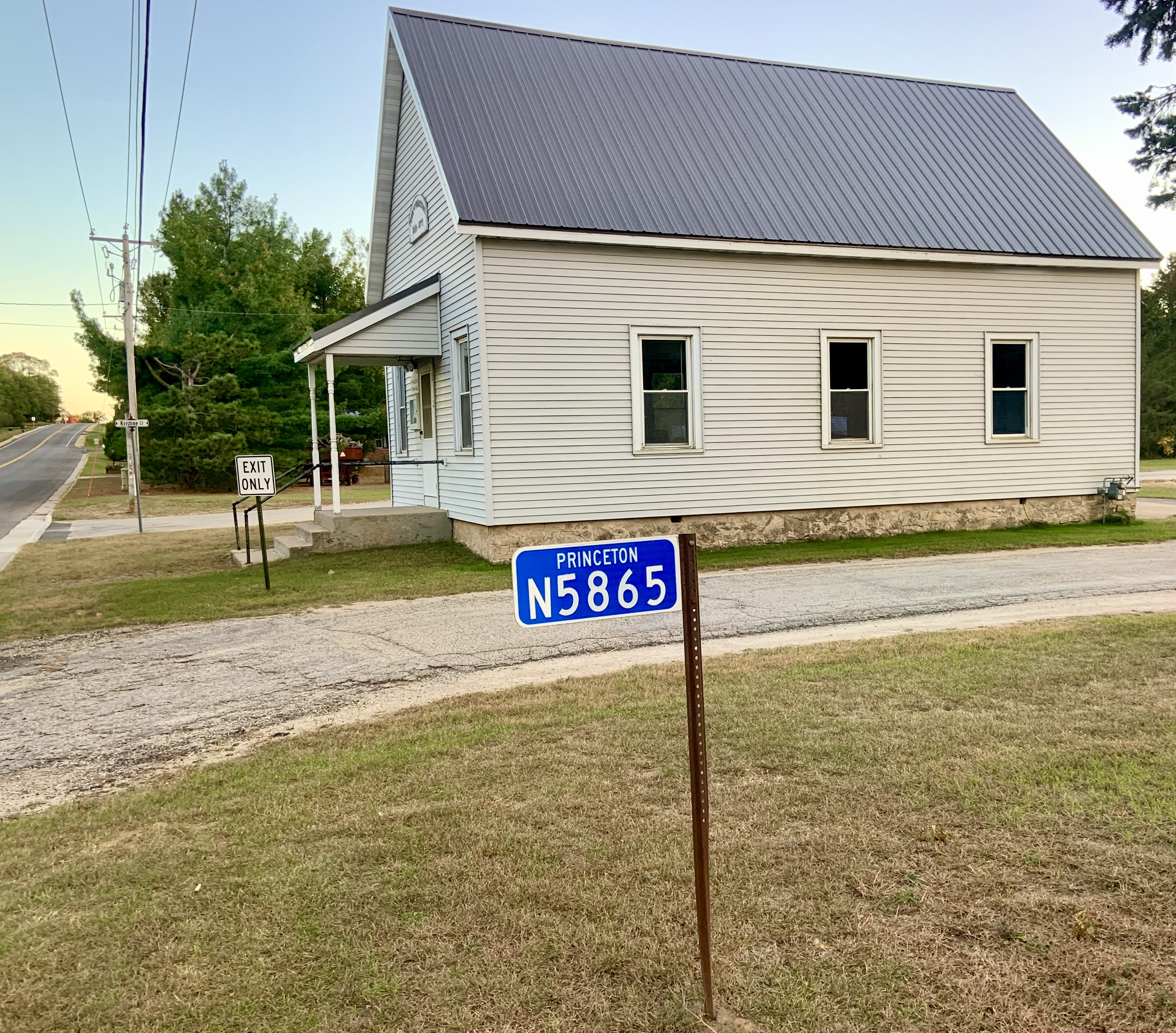
- Town hall

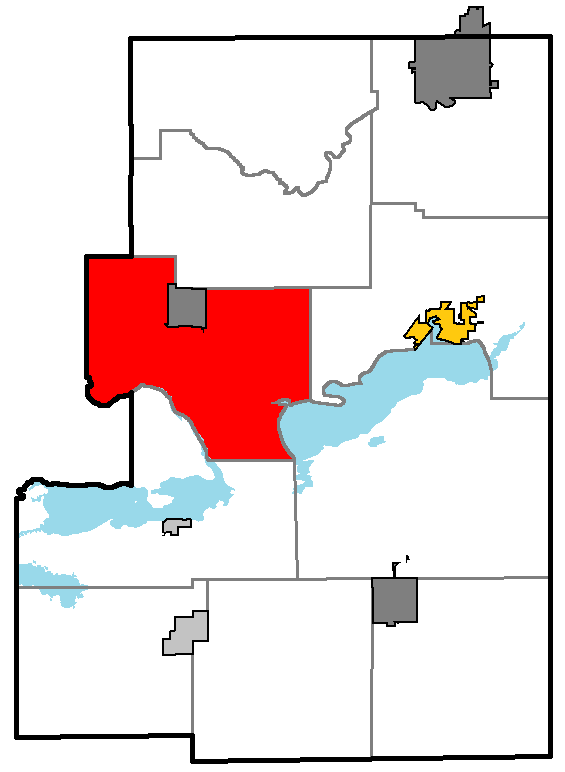
- Location of Princeton, Wisconsin

- Location of Green Lake County, Wisconsin
- Coordinates: 43°49′24″N 89°6′42″W
- Country: United States
- State: Wisconsin
- County: Green Lake

Area
  - Total: 35.6 sq mi (92.3 km^{2})
  - Land: 35.3 sq mi (91.5 km^{2})
  - Water: 0.31 sq mi (0.8 km^{2})
- Elevation: 790 ft (240 m)

Population (2020)
  - Total: 1,519
  - Density: 43.0/sq mi (16.6/km^{2})
- Time zone: UTC-6 (Central (CST))
  - Summer (DST): UTC-5 (CDT)
- Area code: 920
- FIPS code: 55-65625
- GNIS feature ID: 1583987
- Website: https://tn.princeton.wi.gov/

Princeton is a town in Green Lake County, Wisconsin, United States. The population was 1,519 at the 2020 census. The City of Princeton is located within the town. The unincorporated community of Green Lake Terrace is also located in the town.

== Geography ==
According to the United States Census Bureau, the town has a total area of 35.6 square miles (92.3 km^{2}), of which 35.3 square miles (91.5 km^{2}) is land and 0.3 square mile (0.8 km^{2}) (0.84%) is water.

== Demographics ==
As of the census of 2000, there were 1,540 people, 650 households, and 462 families residing in the town. The population density was 43.6 people per square mile (16.8/km^{2}). There were 1,105 housing units at an average density of 31.3 per square mile (12.1/km^{2}). The racial makeup of the town was 98.12% White, 0.39% Black or African American, 0.32% Native American, 0.06% Asian, 0.13% from other races, and 0.97% from two or more races. 0.91% of the population were Hispanic or Latino of any race.

There were 650 households, out of which 26.2% had children under the age of 18 living with them, 62.5% were married couples living together, 5.5% had a female householder with no husband present, and 28.9% were non-families. 25.1% of all households were made up of individuals, and 10.0% had someone living alone who was 65 years of age or older. The average household size was 2.37 and the average family size was 2.81.

In the town, the population was spread out, with 22.0% under the age of 18, 4.4% from 18 to 24, 25.5% from 25 to 44, 28.1% from 45 to 64, and 20.1% who were 65 years of age or older. The median age was 44 years. For every 100 females, there were 111.0 males. For every 100 females age 18 and over, there were 107.8 males.

The median income for a household in the town was $37,340, and the median income for a family was $47,500. Males had a median income of $34,097 versus $24,375 for females. The per capita income for the town was $20,003. About 5.7% of families and 8.2% of the population were below the poverty line, including 11.6% of those under age 18 and 4.4% of those age 65 or over.

== Education ==
The vast majority of Princeton town is in Princeton School District. Pieces are in Green Lake School District and Markesan School District.
