= Packwaukee, Wisconsin =

- Town
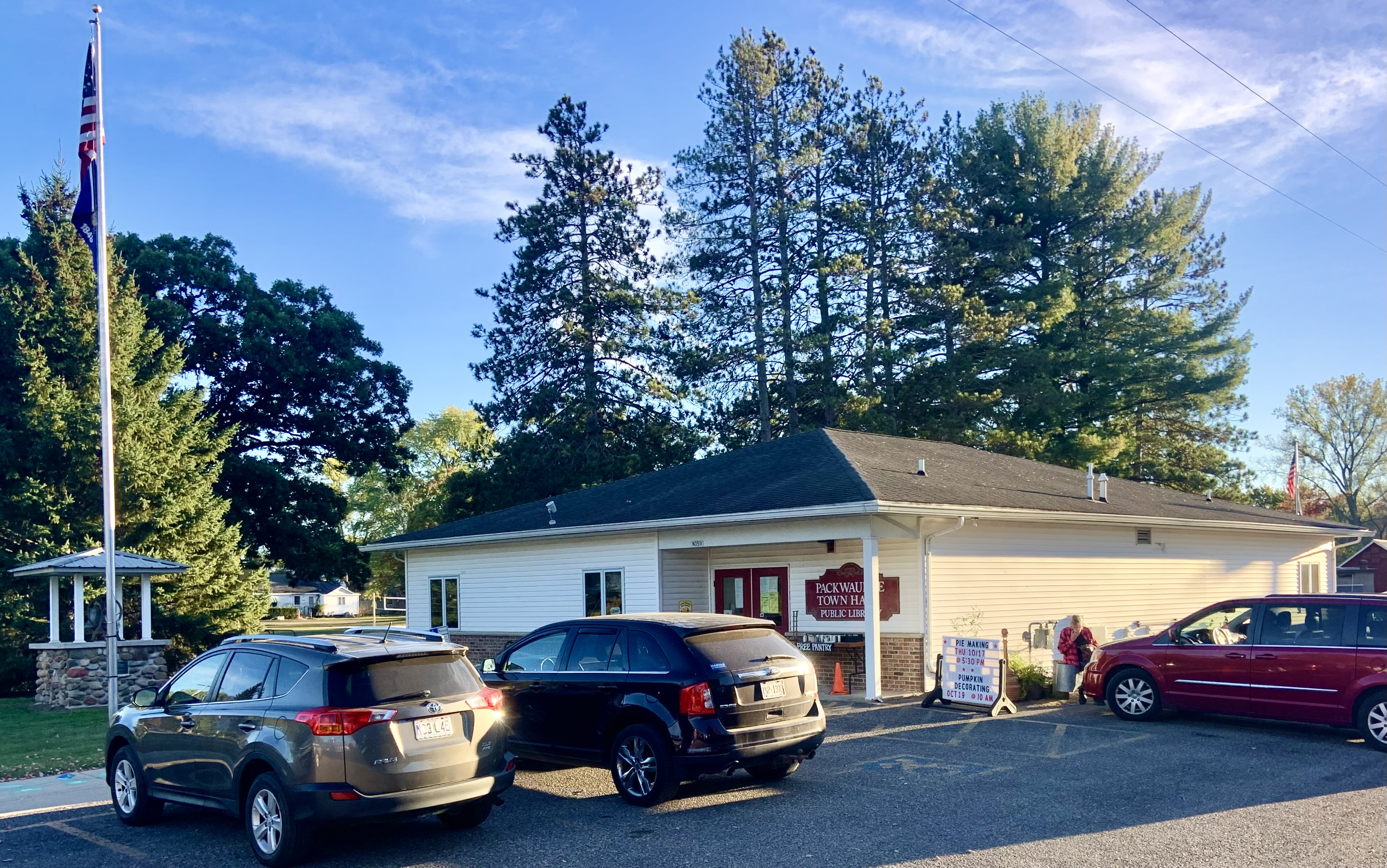
- Town hall

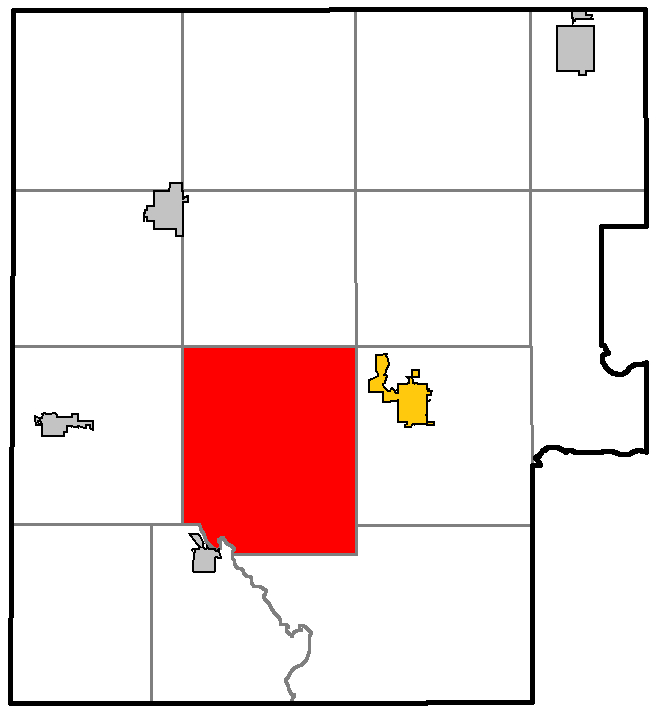
- Location of Packwaukee, Wisconsin

- Location of Marquette County, Wisconsin
- Coordinates: 43°46′17″N 89°25′54″W
- Country: United States
- State: Wisconsin
- County: Marquette

Area
  - Total: 40.9 sq mi (106.0 km^{2})
  - Land: 38.1 sq mi (98.7 km^{2})
  - Water: 2.8 sq mi (7.3 km^{2})
- Elevation: 791 ft (241 m)

Population (2020)
  - Total: 1,469
  - Density: 38.5/sq mi (14.9/km^{2})
- Time zone: UTC-6 (Central (CST))
  - Summer (DST): UTC-5 (CDT)
- Area code: 608
- FIPS code: 55-60962
- GNIS feature ID: 1583888
- Website: http://www.townofpackwaukee.org

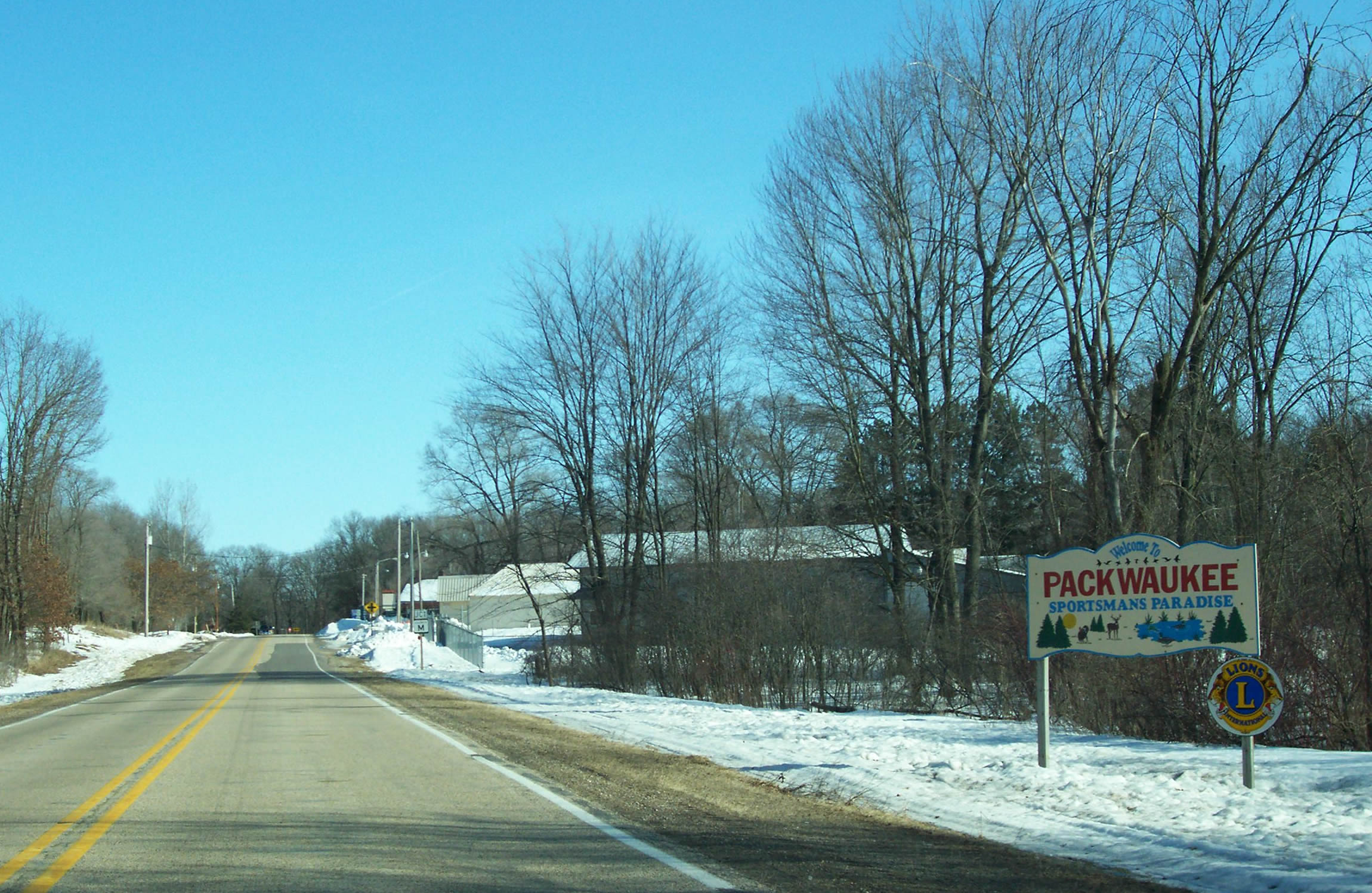
Welcome sign

Packwaukee is a town in Marquette County, Wisconsin, United States. The population was 1,469 at the 2020 census. The unincorporated communities of Buffalo Shore Estates and Packwaukee are located in the town.

Packwaukee was named in honor of Winnebego Chief Packwaukee. It was plotted in 1850 and a post office established. The name Packwaukee comes from the Ojibwa, meaning 'shallow land', or the Potawatomi, meaning 'it is shallow'. Pioneer missionary priest Father Verwyst claimed the name came from the Ojibwa word for 'forest opening'. In the Menominee language, it is called Paehkuahkiw, which means 'small round elevation, hillock'.

== Geography ==
According to the United States Census Bureau, the town has a total area of 40.9 square miles (106.0 km^{2}), of which 38.1 square miles (98.7 km^{2}) is land and 2.8 square miles (7.3 km^{2}) (6.91%) is water.

== Demographics ==
As of the census of 2000, there were 2,574 people, 563 households, and 377 families residing in the town. The population density was 67.5 people per square mile (26.1/km^{2}). There were 932 housing units at an average density of 24.5 per square mile (9.4/km^{2}). The racial makeup of the town was 72.80% White, 19.46% African American, 4.47% Native American, 0.27% Asian, 0.04% Pacific Islander, 0.08% from other races, and 2.87% from two or more races. Hispanic or Latino people of any race were 8.55% of the population.

There were 563 households, out of which 20.4% had children under the age of 18 living with them, 56.8% were married couples living together, 5.7% had a female householder with no husband present, and 32.9% were non-families. 27.2% of all households were made up of individuals, and 11.9% had someone living alone who was 65 years of age or older. The average household size was 2.28 and the average family size was 2.76.

In the town, the population was spread out, with 9.8% under the age of 18, 8.6% from 18 to 24, 45.5% from 25 to 44, 23.5% from 45 to 64, and 12.7% who were 65 years of age or older. The median age was 39 years. For every 100 females, there were 304.7 males. For every 100 females age 18 and over, there were 354.6 males.

The median income for a household in the town was $31,823, and the median income for a family was $38,233. Males had a median income of $28,333 versus $22,813 for females. The per capita income for the town was $14,481. About 4.7% of families and 5.1% of the population were below the poverty line, including 6.0% of those under age 18 and 5.5% of those age 65 or over.

== History ==
Packwaukee was settled in 1849 by E. Pettengill, E. T. Older, C. G. Barker, Jesse Older, William Ewen, David Phelps, S. A. Pease, John Chapman, E. King, and Samuel Wayman.

A railroad line was constructed in 1881 to connect the Montello Granite Co. quarry to Packwaukee and the Wisconsin Central Railroad. In 1884, a depot was moved to Packwaukee. It was 20 by 40 ft (6.1 by 12.2 m) and had a waiting room, agent room, and small baggage room. It burned to the ground at 3:00 a.m. on January 11, 1907.
