= Crystal Lake, Marquette County, Wisconsin =

Crystal Lake, Wisconsin
- Town
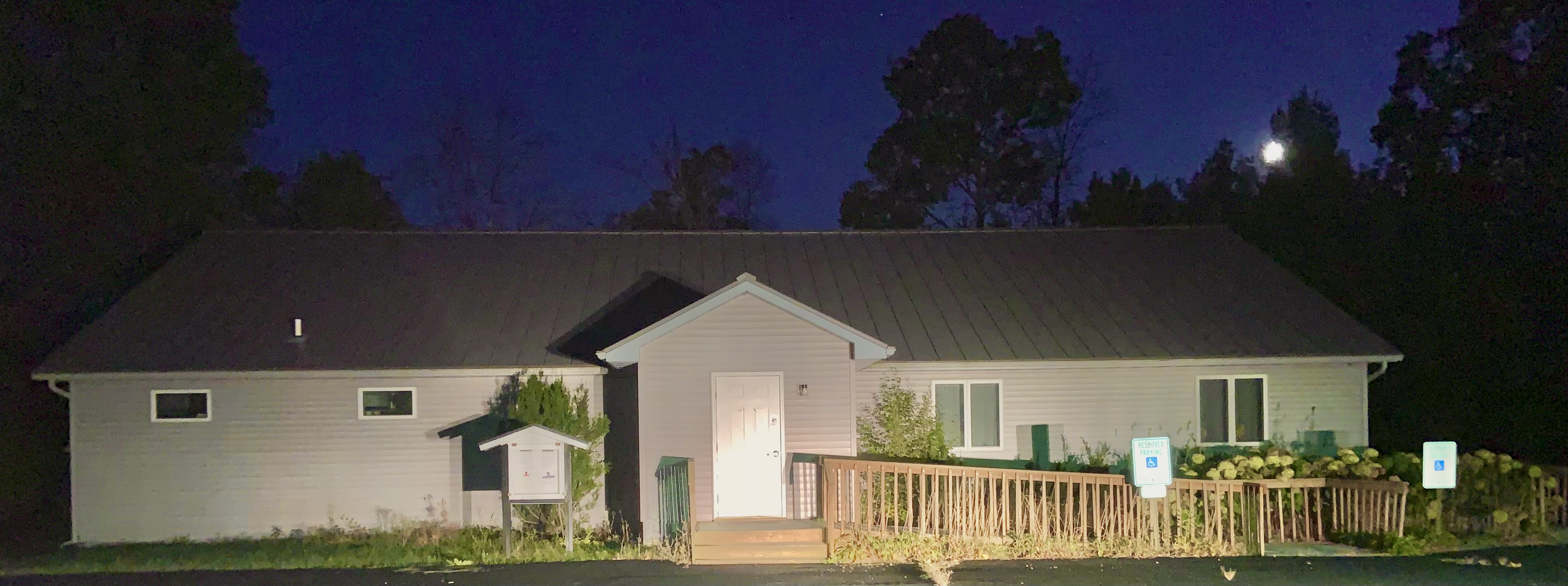
- Town hall

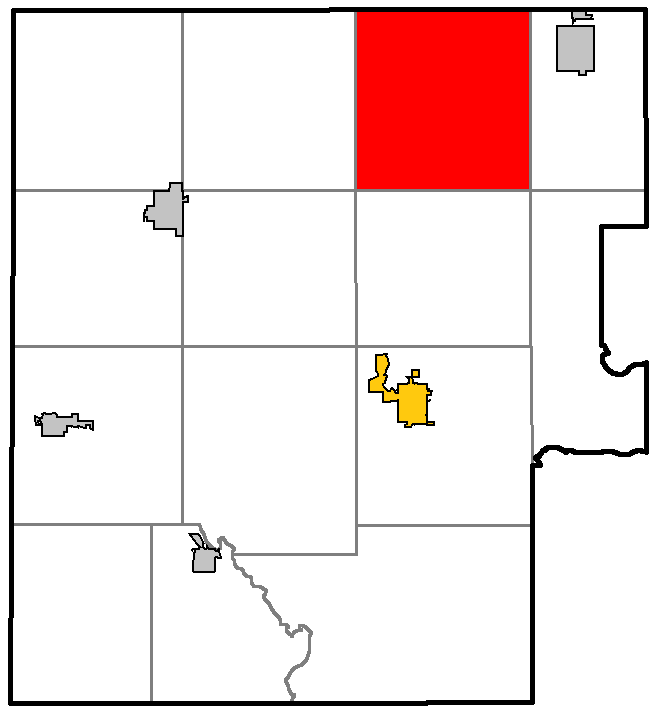
- Location of Crystal Lake, Marquette County, Wisconsin

- Location of Marquette County, Wisconsin
- Coordinates: 43°57′0″N 89°19′12″W
- Country: United States
- State: Wisconsin
- County: Marquette

Area
  - Total: 35.9 sq mi (93.0 km^{2})
  - Land: 35.3 sq mi (91.4 km^{2})
  - Water: 0.58 sq mi (1.5 km^{2})
- Elevation: 820 ft (250 m)

Population (2020)
  - Total: 452
  - Density: 12.8/sq mi (4.95/km^{2})
- Time zone: UTC-6 (Central (CST))
  - Summer (DST): UTC-5 (CDT)
- FIPS code: 55-17900
- GNIS feature ID: 1583033
- Website: https://town.crystallake.wi.gov/

Crystal Lake is a town in Marquette County, Wisconsin, United States. The population was 452 at the 2020 census. The unincorporated community of Budsin is located in the town.

== Geography ==
According to the United States Census Bureau, the town has a total area of 35.9 square miles (93.0 km^{2}), of which 35.3 square miles (91.4 km^{2}) is land and 0.6 square mile (1.5 km^{2}) (1.64%) is water.

== Demographics ==
As of the census of 2000, there were 513 people, 231 households, and 167 families residing in the town. The population density was 14.5 people per square mile (5.6/km^{2}). There were 442 housing units at an average density of 12.5 per square mile (4.8/km^{2}). The racial makeup of the town was 98.25% White, 0.39% African American, 0.19% Native American, 0.19% Asian, 0.58% Pacific Islander, and 0.39% from two or more races. Hispanic or Latino people of any race were 0.19% of the population.

There were 231 households, out of which 16.0% had children under the age of 18 living with them, 66.7% were married couples living together, 3.5% had a female householder with no husband present, and 27.3% were non-families. 20.8% of all households were made up of individuals, and 10.8% had someone living alone who was 65 years of age or older. The average household size was 2.22 and the average family size was 2.50.

In the town, the population was spread out, with 15.8% under the age of 18, 3.9% from 18 to 24, 22.2% from 25 to 44, 28.3% from 45 to 64, and 29.8% who were 65 years of age or older. The median age was 54 years. For every 100 females, there were 112.9 males. For every 100 females age 18 and over, there were 105.7 males.

The median income for a household in the town was $38,304, and the median income for a family was $43,000. Males had a median income of $30,781 versus $25,000 for females. The per capita income for the town was $21,824. About 1.3% of families and 6.0% of the population were below the poverty line, including none of those under age 18 and 8.9% of those age 65 or over.
