= Mecan (community), Wisconsin =

Mecan, Wisconsin
- Unincorporated community
- Location within Wisconsin Location within the United States
- Coordinates: 43°47′46″N 89°12′54″W
- Country: United States
- State: Wisconsin
- County: Marquette
- Elevation: 807 ft (246 m)

Population
  - Total: 752
- Time zone: UTC-6 (Central (CST))
  - Summer (DST): UTC-5 (CDT)
- Area code: 608
- GNIS feature ID: 1577720

Mecan is an unincorporated community located in the town of Mecan, Marquette County, Wisconsin, United States. As of the 2020 census it had a population of 752.
