= Neshkoro, Wisconsin =

- Village
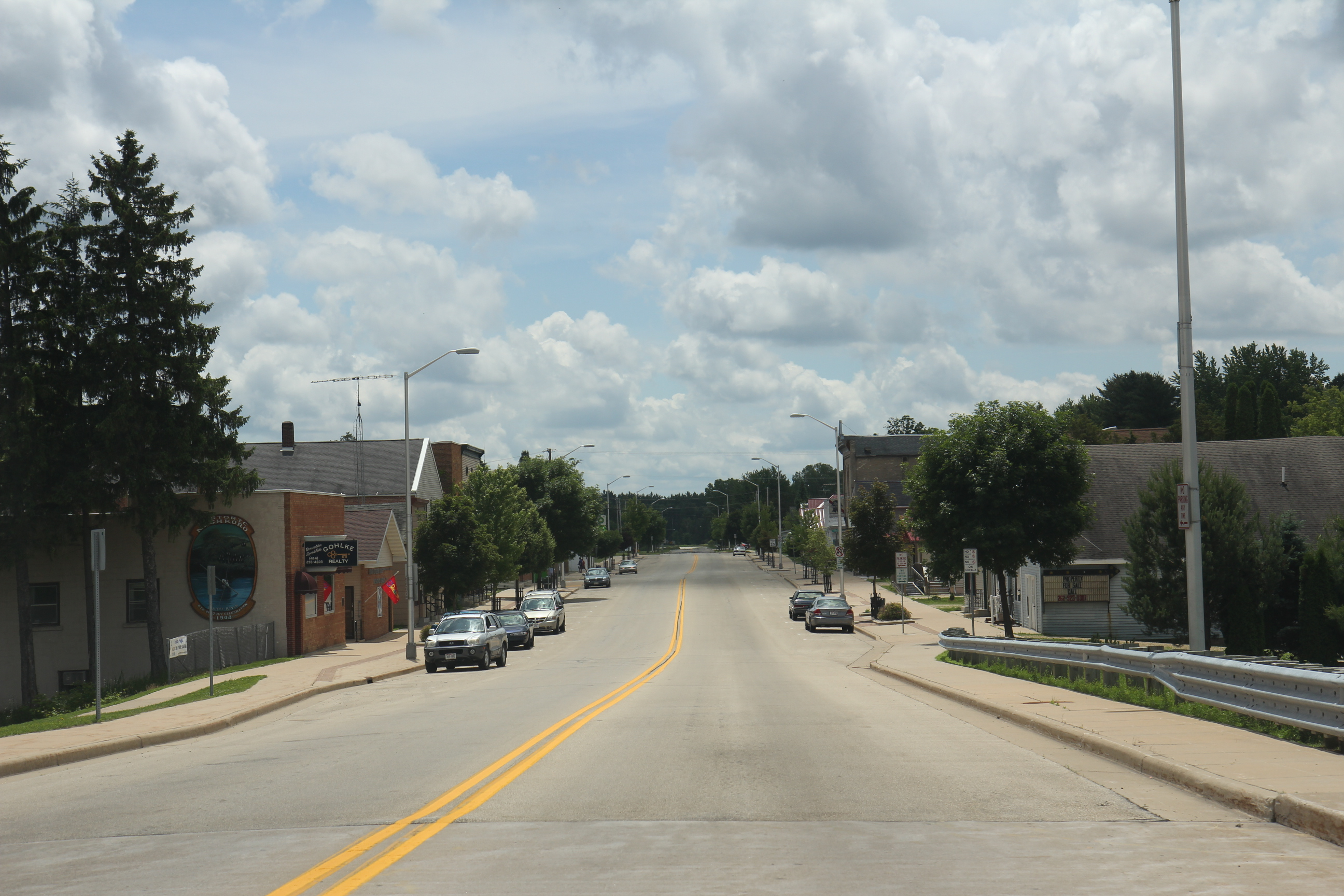
- Looking south at downtown Neshkoro

- Location of Neshkoro in Marquette County, Wisconsin
- Coordinates: 43°57′10″N 89°12′56″W
- Country: United States
- State: Wisconsin
- County: Marquette

Area
  - Total: 2.10 sq mi (5.43 km^{2})
  - Land: 2.01 sq mi (5.20 km^{2})
  - Water: 0.089 sq mi (0.23 km^{2})
- Elevation: 810 ft (247 m)

Population (2020)
  - Total: 412
  - Density: 205/sq mi (79.2/km^{2})
- Time zone: UTC-6 (Central (CST))
  - Summer (DST): UTC-5 (CDT)
- Area code: 920
- FIPS code: 55-56150
- GNIS feature ID: 1570185
- Website: https://neshkorowi.gov/

Neshkoro is a village in Marquette County, Wisconsin, United States. The population was 412 at the 2020 census. The village is located within the Town of Neshkoro.

== Geography ==
Neshkoro is located at 43°57′49″N 89°13′0″W (43.963867, -89.216712).

According to the United States Census Bureau, the village has a total area of 2.10 square miles (5.44 km^{2}), of which 2.01 square miles (5.21 km^{2}) is land and 0.09 square miles (0.23 km^{2}) is water.

== Demographics ==
Historical population
Census	Pop.	Note	%±
1910	379		—
1920	396		4.5%
1930	342		−13.6%
1940	301		−12.0%
1950	361		19.9%
1960	368		1.9%
1970	385		4.6%
1980	386		0.3%
1990	384		−0.5%
2000	453		18.0%
2010	434		−4.2%
2020	412		−5.1%
U.S. Decennial Census

=== 2010 census ===
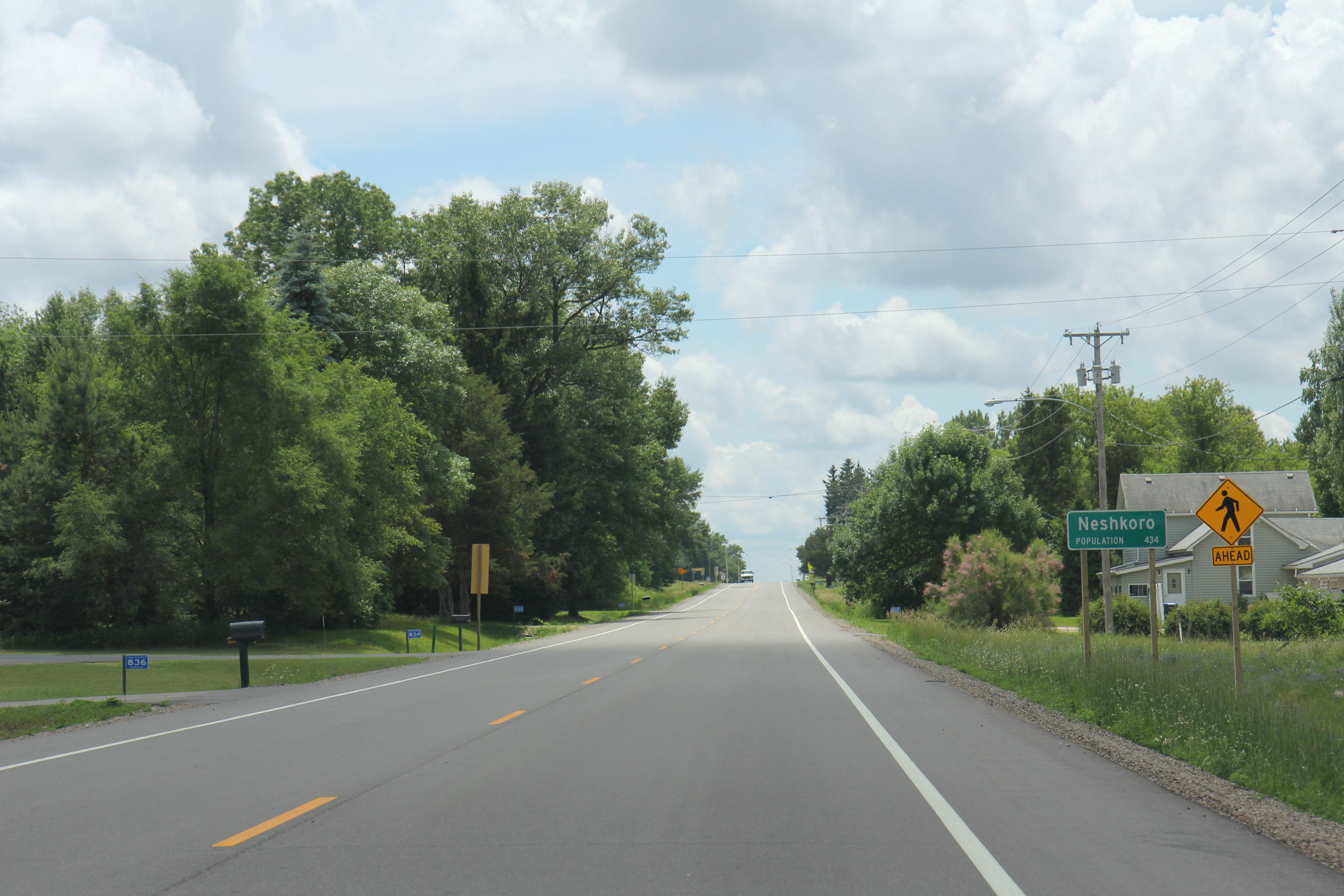
Looking south at the sign for Neshkoro on WIS73

As of the census of 2010, there were 434 people, 205 households, and 119 families living in the village. The population density was 215.9 inhabitants per square mile (83.4/km^{2}). There were 230 housing units at an average density of 114.4 per square mile (44.2/km^{2}). The racial makeup of the village was 97.7% White, 0.7% Native American, 0.7% Asian, and 0.9% from two or more races. Hispanic or Latino people of any race were 4.6% of the population.

There were 205 households, of which 20.0% had children under the age of 18 living with them, 48.8% were married couples living together, 6.3% had a female householder with no husband present, 2.9% had a male householder with no wife present, and 42.0% were non-families. 36.6% of all households were made up of individuals, and 18.1% had someone living alone who was 65 years of age or older. The average household size was 2.12 and the average family size was 2.76.

The median age in the village was 49.2 years. 18.4% of residents were under the age of 18; 6.2% were between the ages of 18 and 24; 17.6% were from 25 to 44; 34.1% were from 45 to 64; and 23.7% were 65 years of age or older. The gender makeup of the village was 48.8% male and 51.2% female.

=== 2000 census ===
As of the census of 2000, there were 453 people, 185 households, and 130 families living in the village. The population density was 191.7 people per square mile (74.1/km^{2}). There were 219 housing units at an average density of 92.7 per square mile (35.8/km^{2}). The racial makeup of the village was 99.12% White, 0.66% Asian, and 0.22% from two or more races. 0.66% of the population were Hispanic or Latino of any race.

There were 185 households, out of which 25.9% had children under the age of 18 living with them, 58.4% were married couples living together, 7.0% had a female householder with no husband present, and 29.7% were non-families. 25.9% of all households were made up of individuals, and 14.1% had someone living alone who was 65 years of age or older. The average household size was 2.32 and the average family size was 2.78.

In the village, the population was spread out, with 21.2% under the age of 18, 5.7% from 18 to 24, 24.9% from 25 to 44, 23.6% from 45 to 64, and 24.5% who were 65 years of age or older. The median age was 44 years. For every 100 females, there were 98.7 males. For every 100 females age 18 and over, there were 96.2 males.

The median income for a household in the village was $39,167, and the median income for a family was $43,661. Males had a median income of $27,391 versus $19,583 for females. The per capita income for the village was $17,206. About 5.8% of families and 5.5% of the population were below the poverty line, including 14.0% of those under age 18 and 4.9% of those age 65 or over.

== History ==
Neshkoro was founded in 1848. The village was named after two pioneer settlers, Nash and Kora.

== Education ==
It is in the Westfield School District.

== Images ==
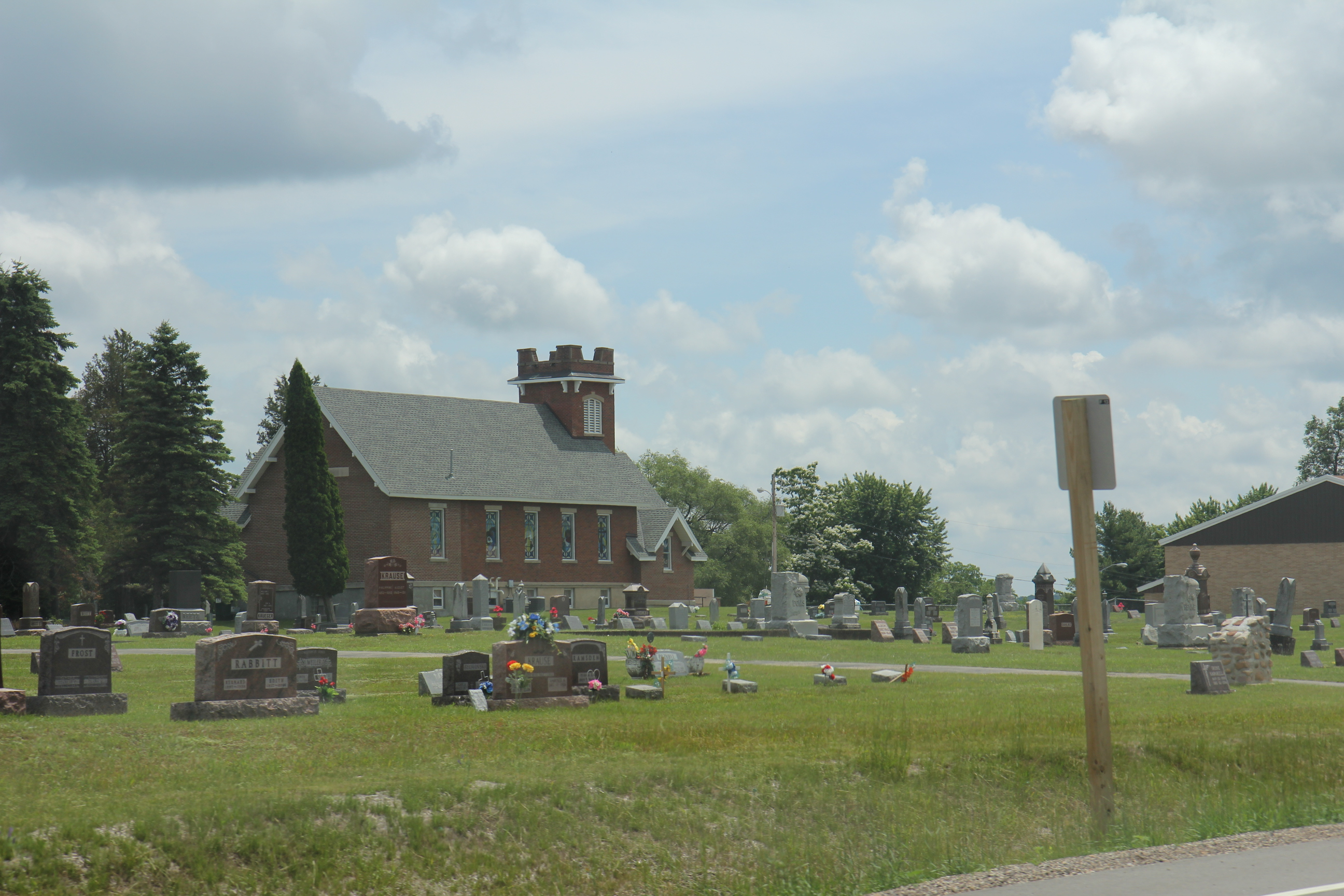
Church and cemetery in Neshkoro

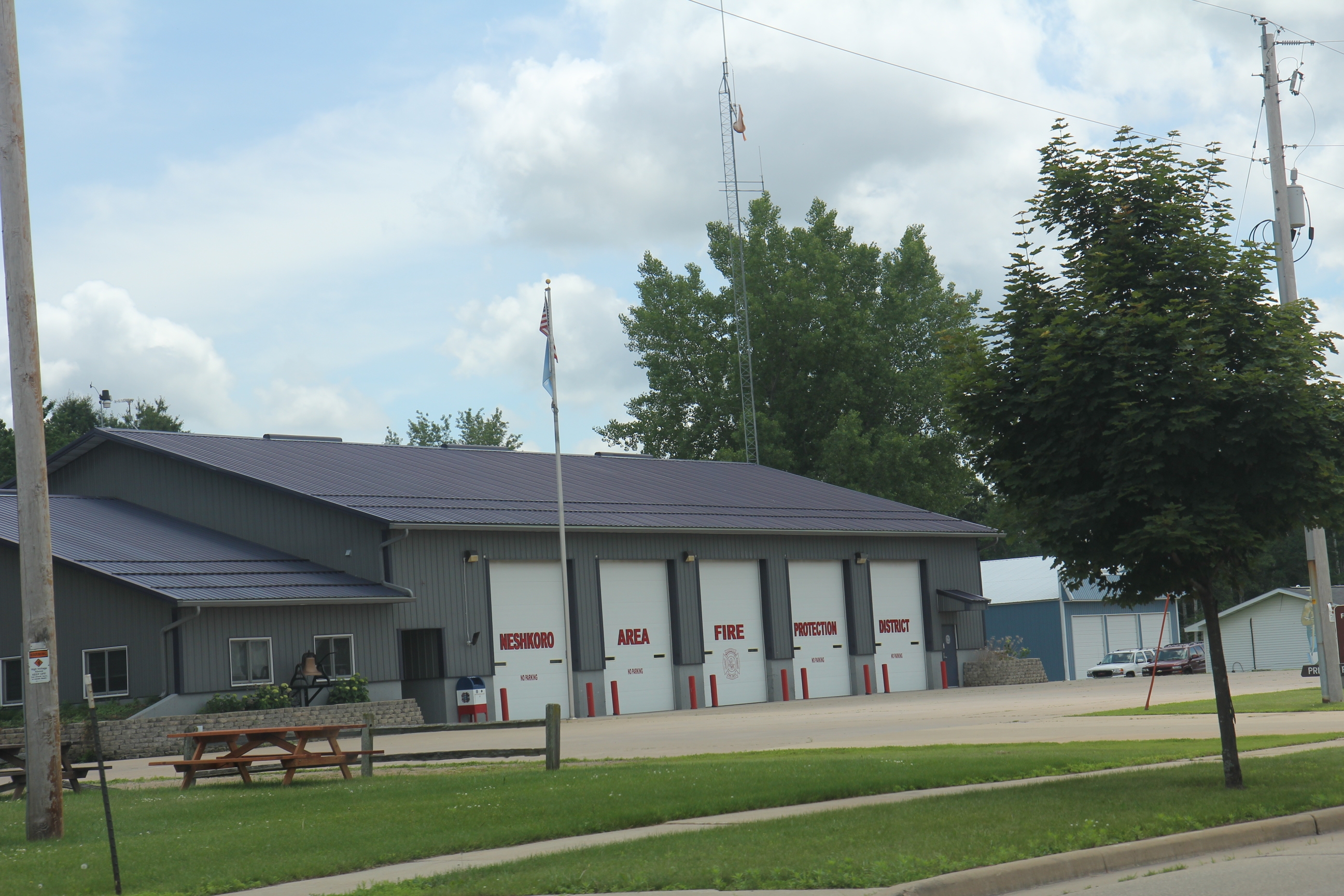
Neshkoro Area Fire Protection District station

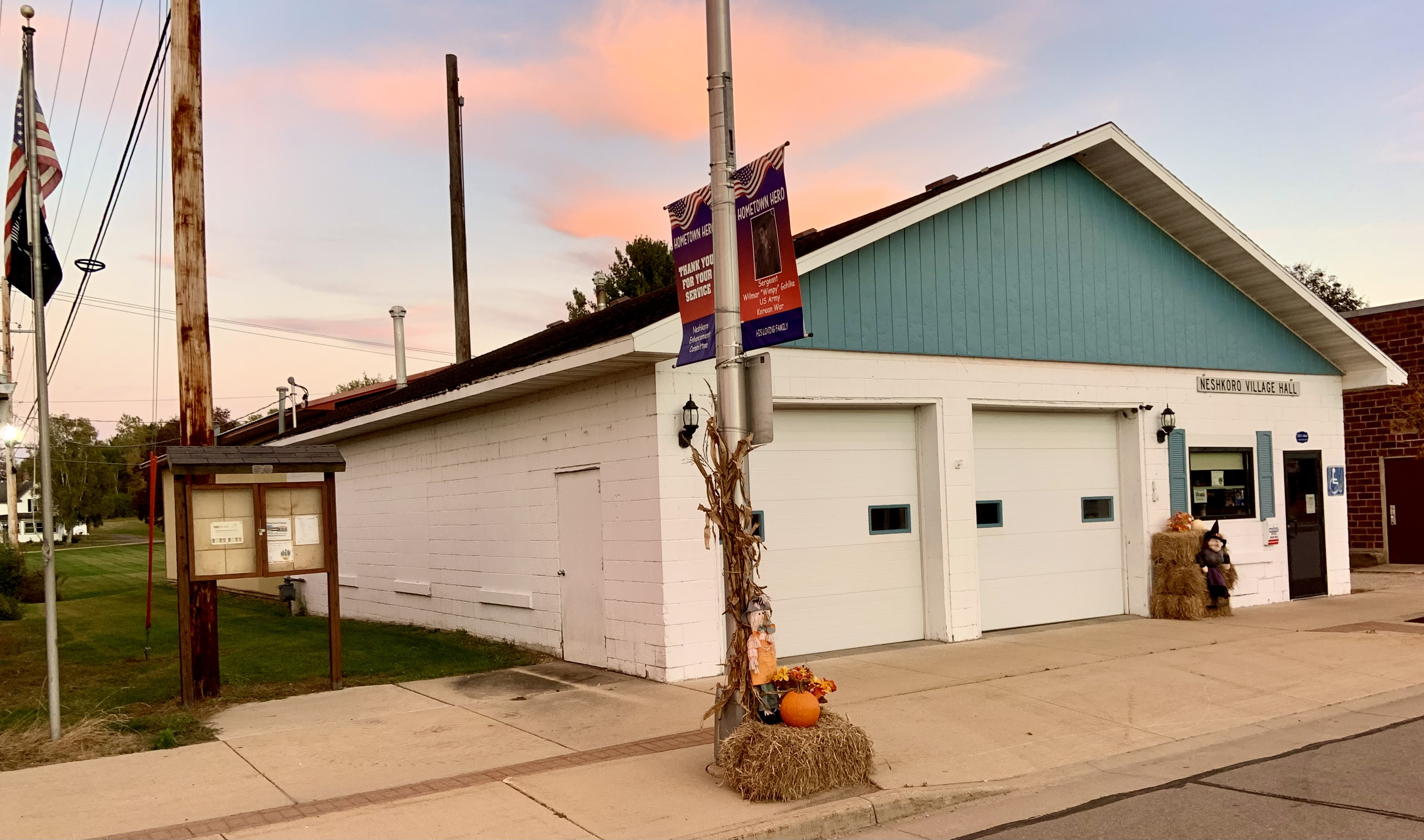
Neshkoro Village Hall
