= Packwaukee (CDP), Wisconsin =

Census-designated place in Wisconsin, United States

Packwaukee, Wisconsin
- Census-designated place
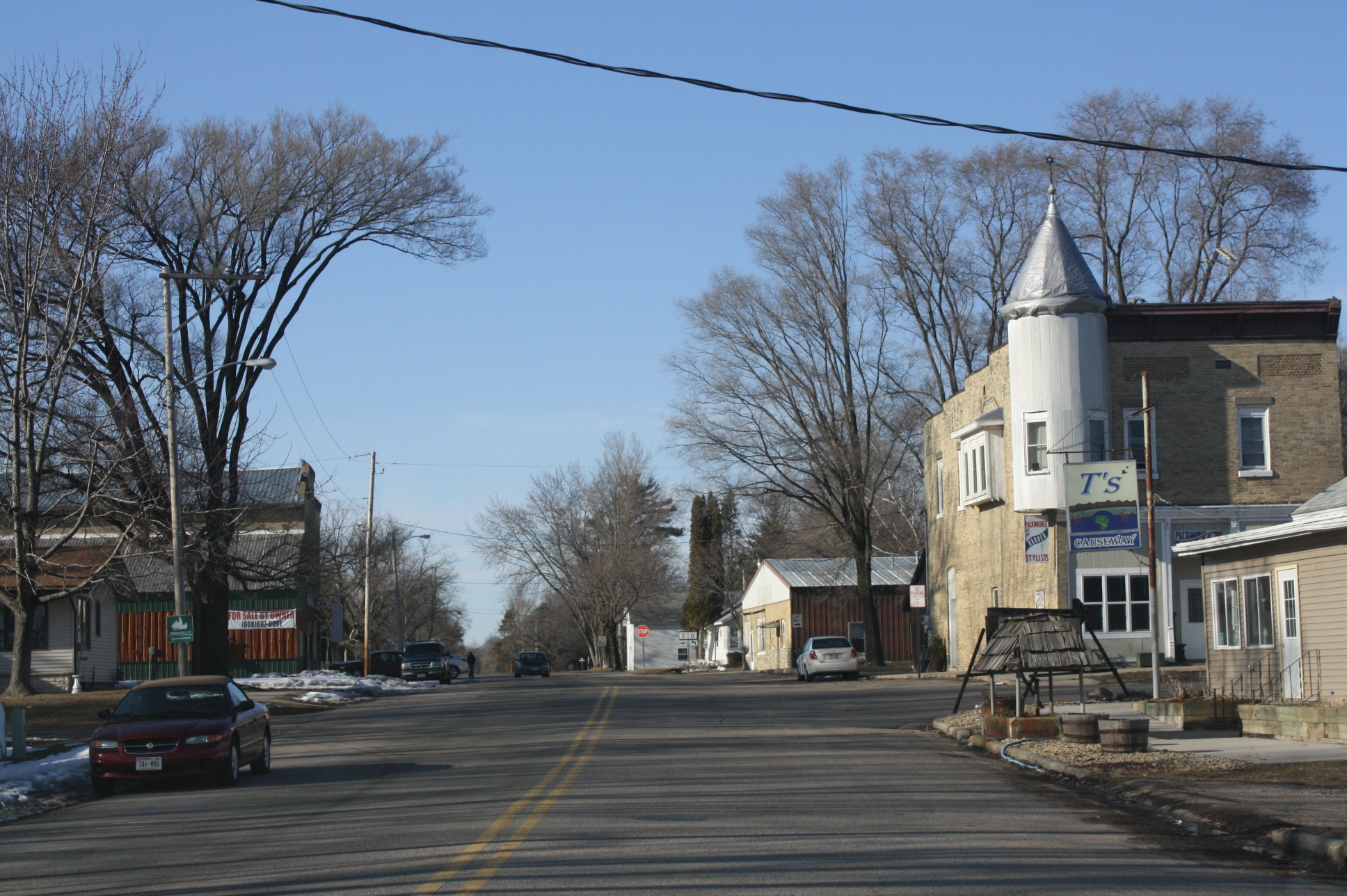
- Looking north in downtown Packwaukee

- Location within Wisconsin
- Coordinates: 43°45′48″N 89°27′30″W
- Country: United States
- State: Wisconsin
- County: Marquette

Area
  - Total: 0.480 sq mi (1.24 km^{2})
  - Land: 0.480 sq mi (1.24 km^{2})
  - Water: 0 sq mi (0 km^{2})
- Elevation: 781 ft (238 m)

Population (2020)
  - Total: 242
  - Density: 504/sq mi (195/km^{2})
- Time zone: UTC-6 (Central (CST))
  - Summer (DST): UTC-5 (CDT)
- ZIP code: 53953
- Area code: 608
- GNIS feature ID: 1570986

Packwaukee is an unincorporated census-designated place located in the town of Packwaukee, Marquette County, Wisconsin, United States. Packwaukee is located on the north bank of Buffalo Lake, a lake on the Fox River; it is 7 miles (11 km) west-southwest of Montello. Packwaukee has a post office with ZIP code 53953. As of the 2020 census, its population was 242, down from 262 at 2010.

== Education ==
It is in the Montello School District.

== Images ==
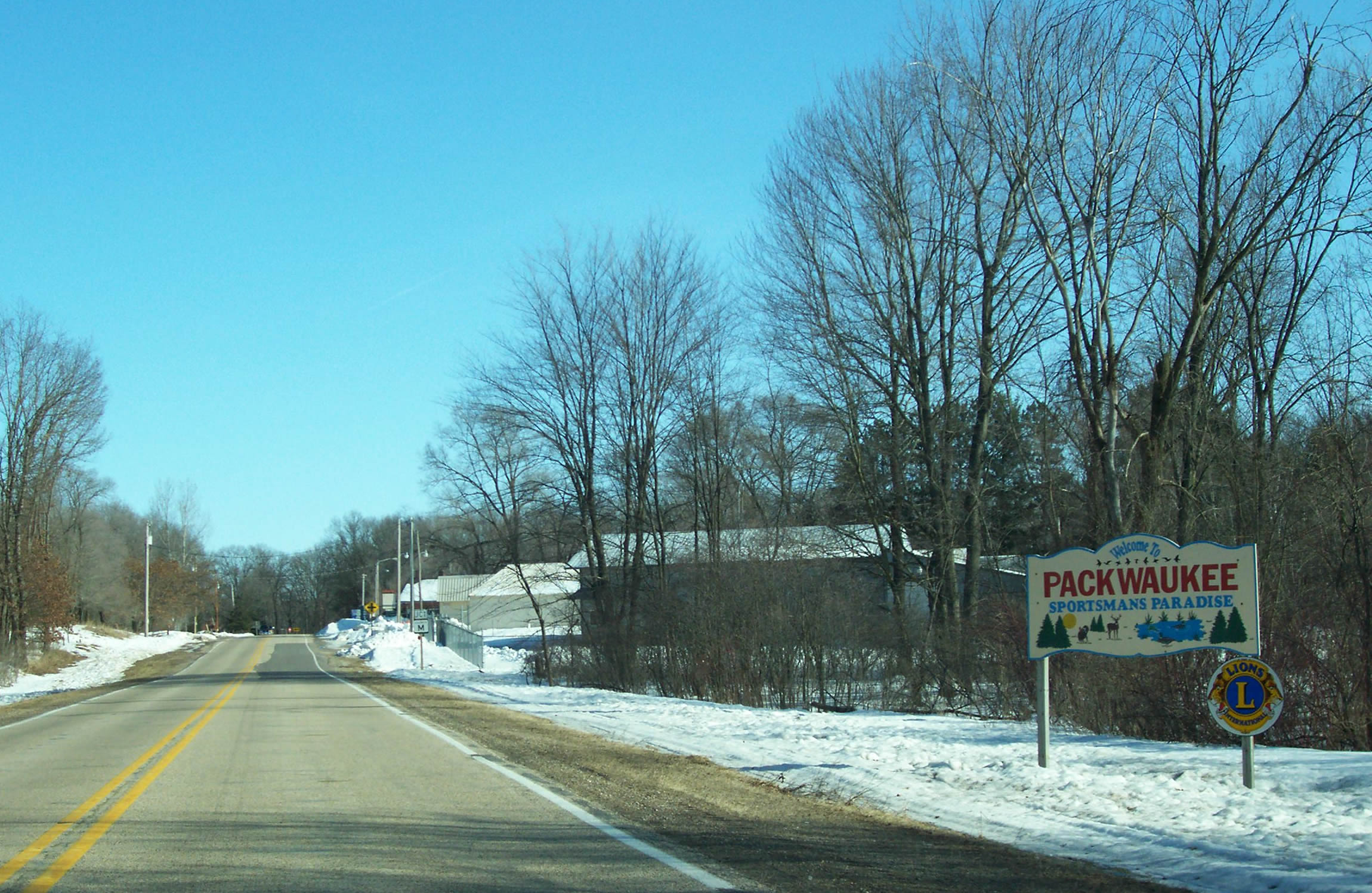
Sign

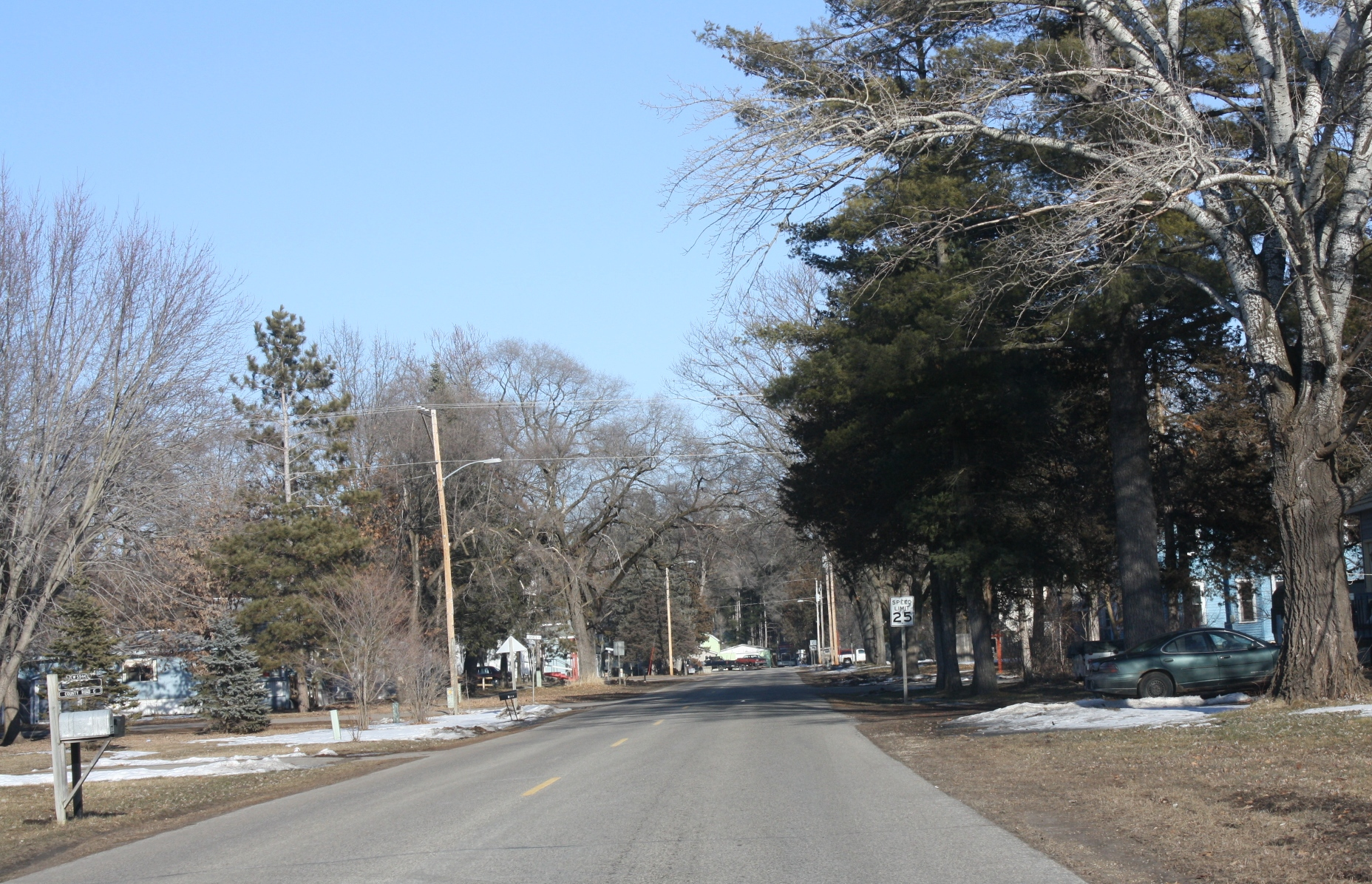
Looking east

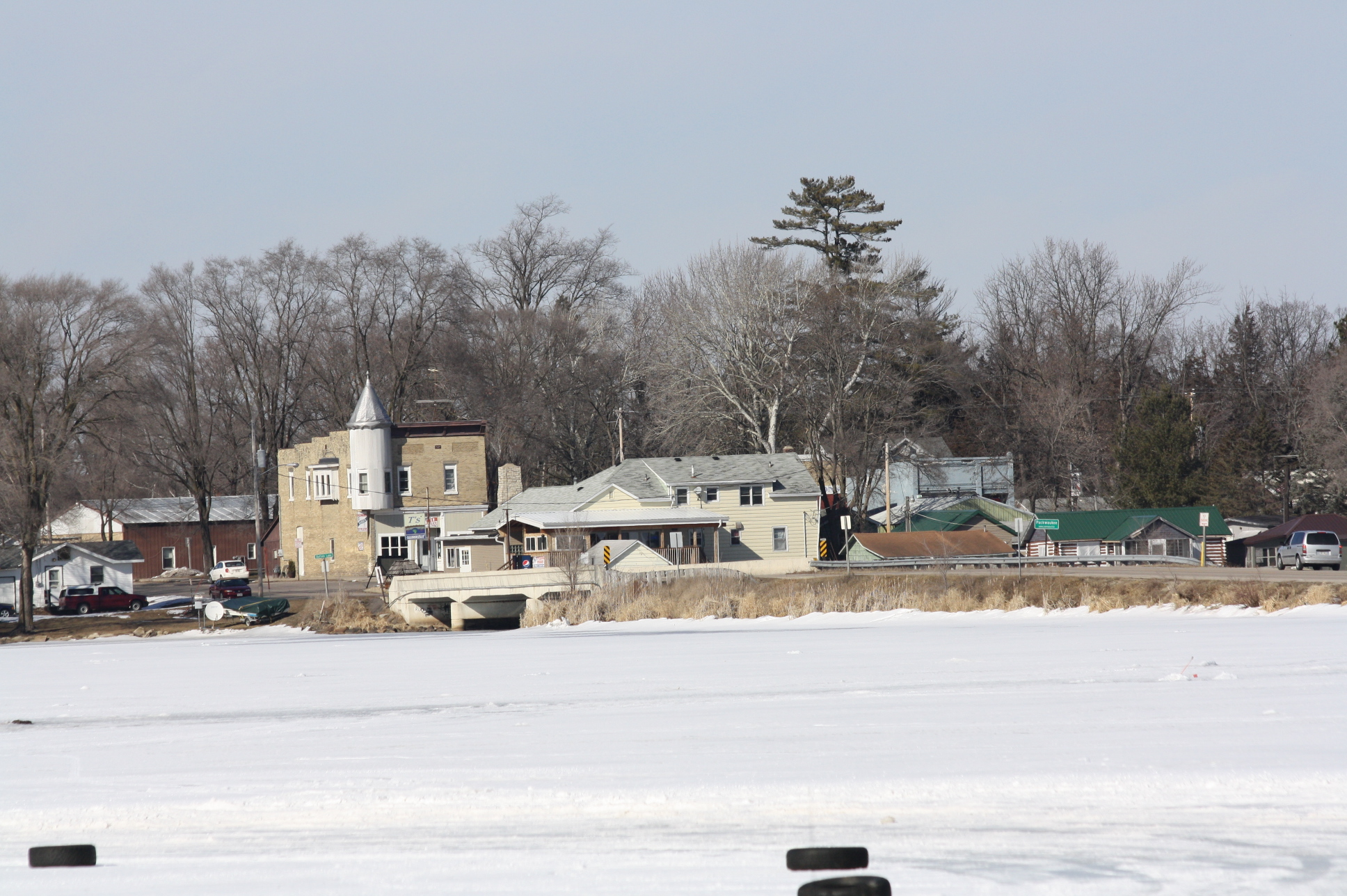
Panorama across Buffalo Lake on the Fox River

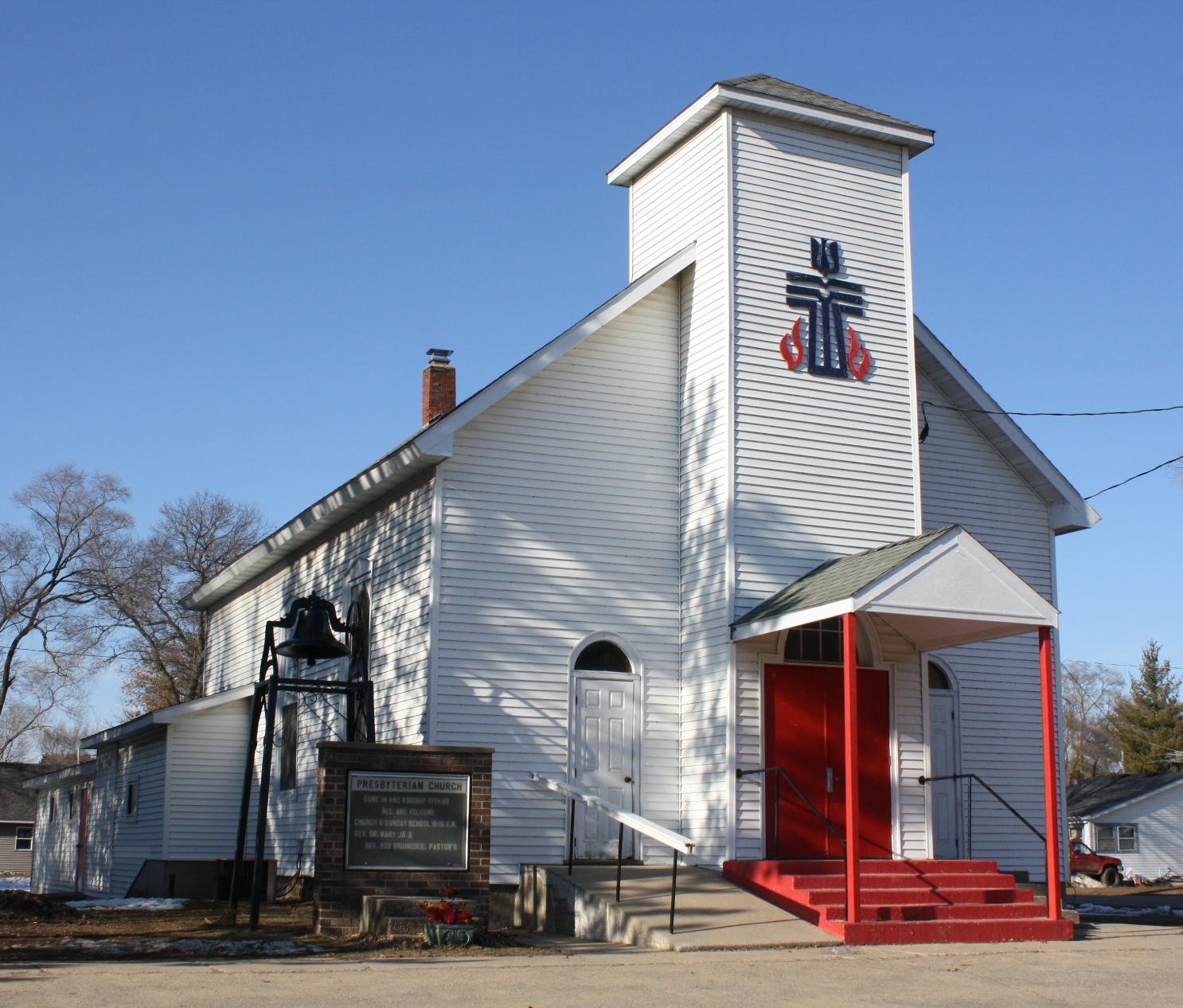
Presbyterian church

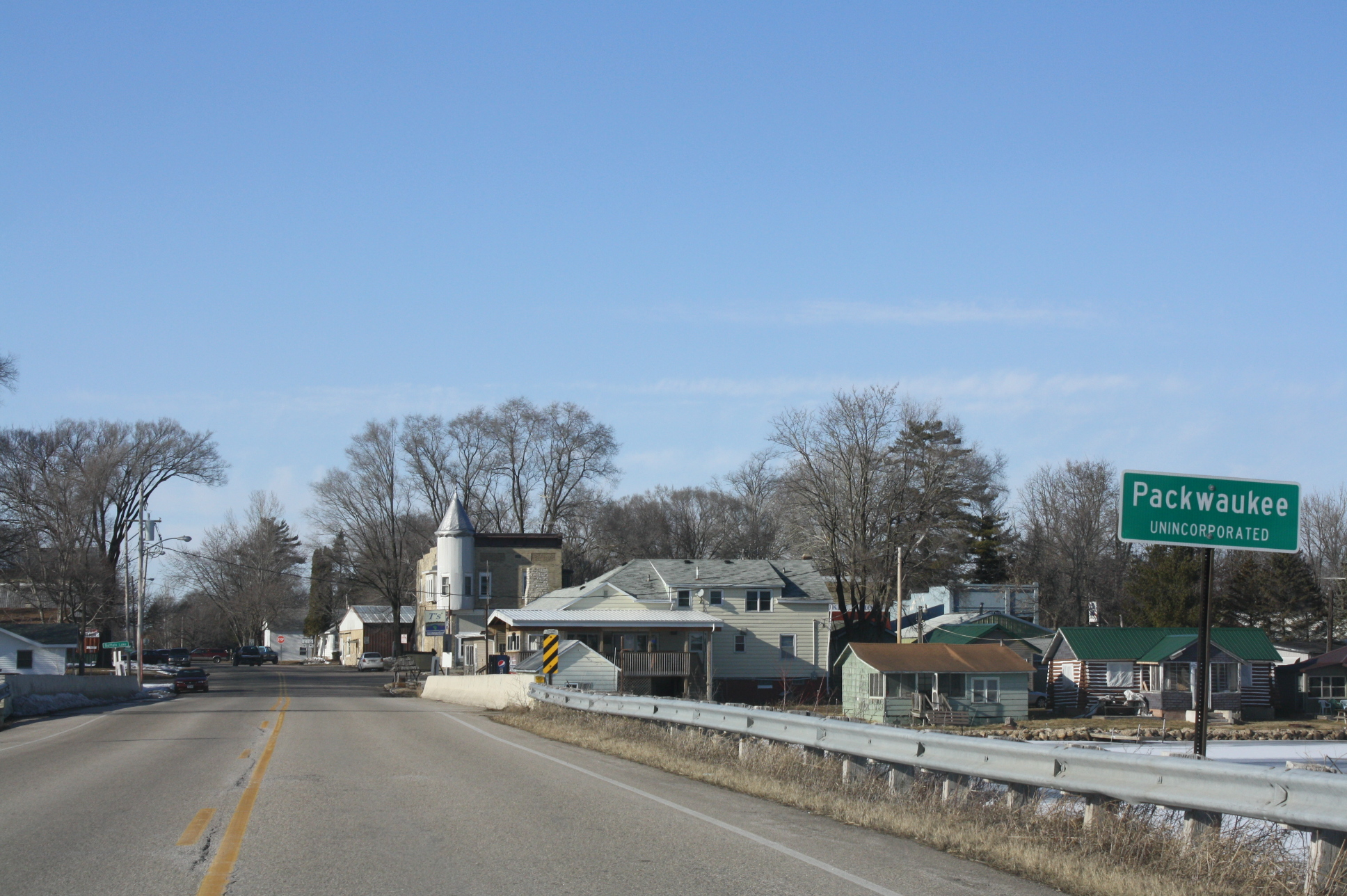
Sign on County D
