= Mecan, Wisconsin =

- Town
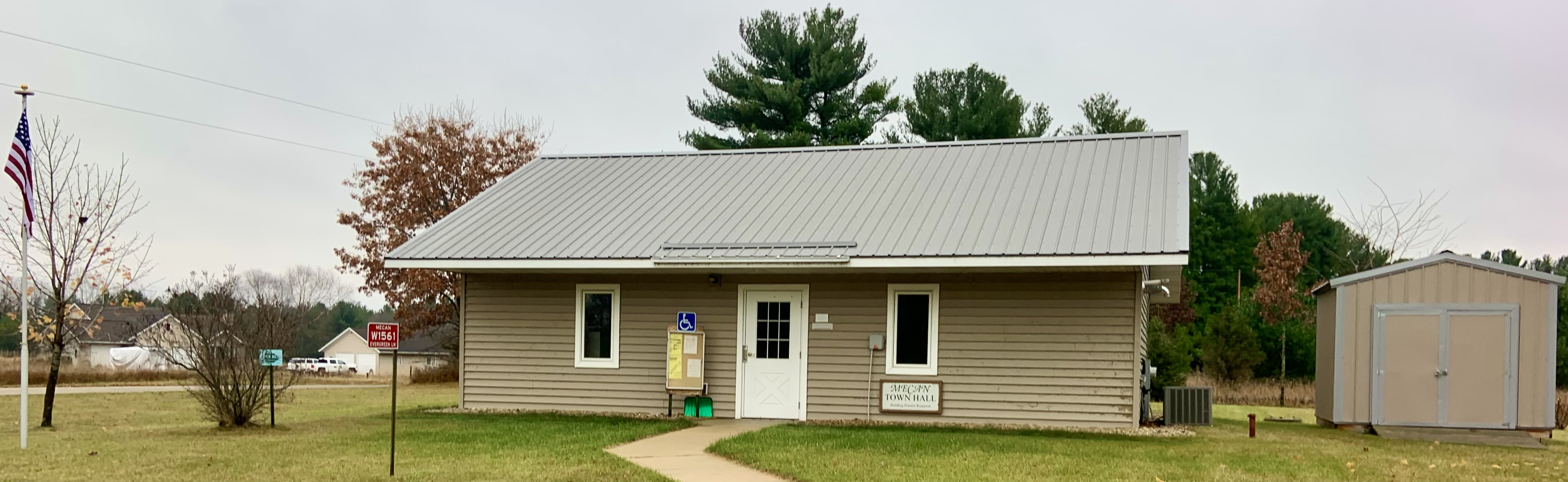
- Town hall

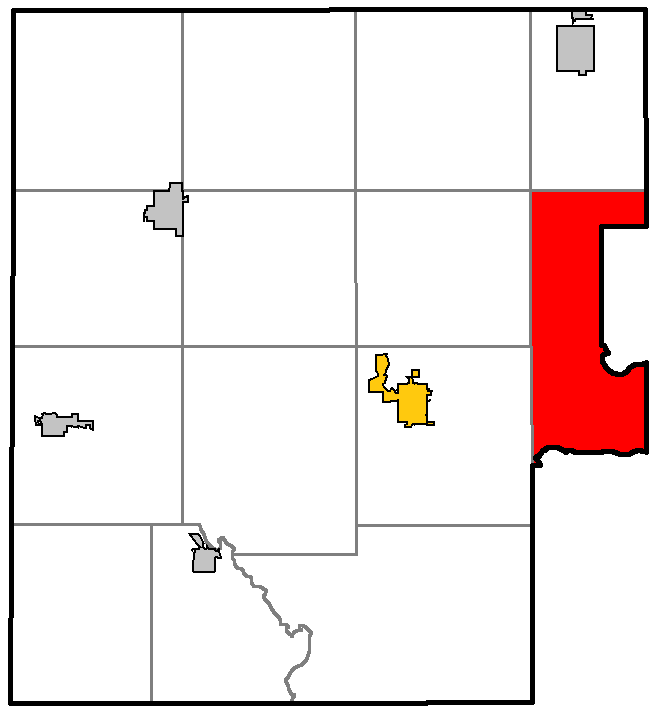
- Location of Mecan, Marquette County, Wisconsin

- Location of Marquette County, Wisconsin
- Coordinates: 43°48′12″N 89°13′1″W
- Country: United States
- State: Wisconsin
- County: Marquette

Area
  - Total: 27.5 sq mi (71.3 km^{2})
  - Land: 27.5 sq mi (71.1 km^{2})
  - Water: 0.077 sq mi (0.2 km^{2})
- Elevation: 778 ft (237 m)

Population (2020)
  - Total: 752
  - Density: 27.4/sq mi (10.6/km^{2})
- Time zone: UTC-6 (Central (CST))
  - Summer (DST): UTC-5 (CDT)
- FIPS code: 55-50350
- GNIS feature ID: 1583681
- Website: https://www.townofmecanwi.gov/

Mecan is a town in Marquette County, Wisconsin, United States. The population was 752 at the 2020 census. The unincorporated community of Mecan is located in the town.

== Geography ==
According to the United States Census Bureau, the town has a total area of 27.5 square miles (71.3 km^{2}), of which 27.5 square miles (71.1 km^{2}) is land and 0.1 square mile (0.2 km^{2}) (0.29%) is water.

== History ==
=== Etymology ===
The name of the town is after Mecan River, which is a corruption of "Namayicun", from one of the Algonquian languages meaning "Sturgeoning Grounds" (cf. Ojibwe language: namekaan, "sturgeoning grounds"). However, Vogel (1991) cites the name to come from the Ojibwe word miikana meaning "road."

== Demographics ==
As of the census of 2000, there were 726 people, 321 households, and 217 families residing in the town. The population density was 26.4 people per square mile (10.2/km^{2}). There were 735 housing units at an average density of 26.8 per square mile (10.3/km^{2}). The racial makeup of the town was 97.11% White, 0.69% African American, 0.14% Native American, 0.41% Asian, 0.69% from other races, and 0.96% from two or more races. Hispanic or Latino people of any race were 1.52% of the population.

There were 321 households, out of which 19.9% had children under the age of 18 living with them, 61.1% were married couples living together, 4.0% had a female householder with no husband present, and 32.1% were non-families. 25.9% of all households were made up of individuals, and 15.3% had someone living alone who was 65 years of age or older. The average household size was 2.26 and the average family size was 2.72.

In the town, the population was spread out, with 17.1% under the age of 18, 5.6% from 18 to 24, 21.6% from 25 to 44, 29.2% from 45 to 64, and 26.4% who were 65 years of age or older. The median age was 47 years. For every 100 females, there were 105.1 males. For every 100 females age 18 and over, there were 102.0 males.

The median income for a household in the town was $31,389, and the median income for a family was $34,519. Males had a median income of $32,778 versus $17,656 for females. The per capita income for the town was $16,464. About 3.8% of families and 5.7% of the population were below the poverty line, including none of those under age 18 and 13.5% of those age 65 or over.

== Education ==
Most of it is in the Princeton School District. Small portions are in the Montello School District.
