= Buffalo Shore Estates, Wisconsin =

- Unincorporated community
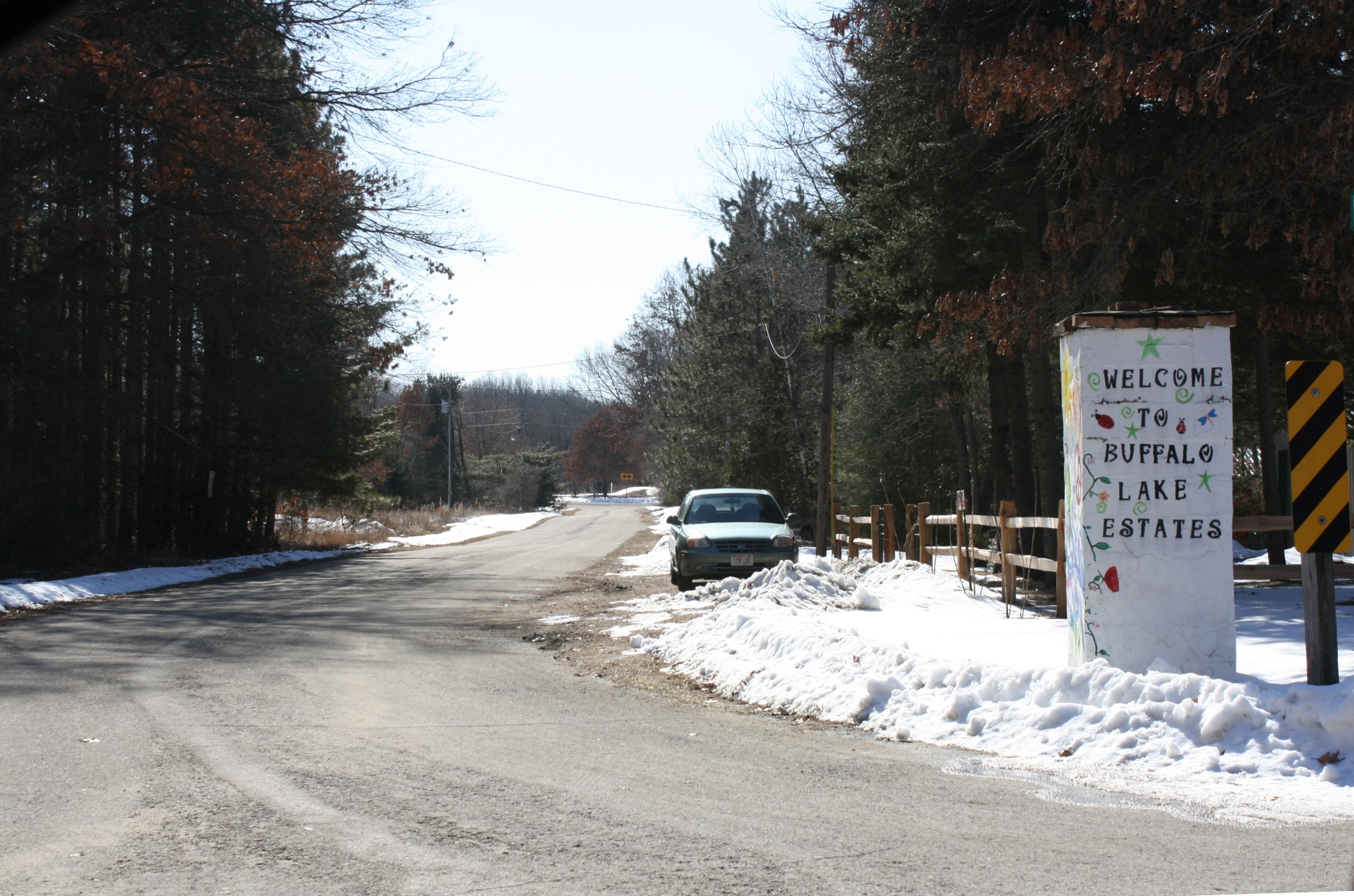
- Signpost

- Location within Wisconsin Location within the United States
- Coordinates: 43°44′27″N 89°28′15″W
- Country: United States
- State: Wisconsin
- County: Marquette
- Elevation: 794 ft (242 m)
- Time zone: UTC-6 (Central (CST))
  - Summer (DST): UTC-5 (CDT)
- Area code: 920
- GNIS feature ID: 1562372

Buffalo Shore Estates is an unincorporated community located in the town of Packwaukee, Marquette County, Wisconsin, United States.
