= Princeton School District =

School district in Wisconsin, United States

Address
- 604 Old Green Lake Road Princeton, Wisconsin, 54968; United States

District information
- Type: Public
- Grades: PreK–12
- NCES District ID: 5512300

Students and staff
- Students: 322
- Teachers: 28.2
- Staff: 21.26
- Student–teacher ratio: 11.42

Other information
- Website: princetonschooldistrict.org

Princeton School District is located in Princeton, Wisconsin. The district has one K-12 school on Old Green Lake Road in the city of Princeton.

The district is mostly in Green Lake County. In addition to the city, it includes most of Princeton Town and parts of St. Marie Town.

A portion is in Marquette County. The district there includes most of Mecan Town, much of Neshkoro Town, and parts of Shields Town.
