= Harrisville, Wisconsin =

Census-designated place in Wisconsin, United States

- Census-designated place
- Location within Wisconsin Location within the United States
- Coordinates: 43°52′40″N 89°24′19″W
- Country: United States
- State: Wisconsin
- County: Marquette
- Elevation: 820 ft (250 m)

Population (2020)
  - Total: 90
- Time zone: UTC-6 (Central (CST))
  - Summer (DST): UTC-5 (CDT)
- Area code: 608
- GNIS feature ID: 1566100

Harrisville is an unincorporated community and census-designated place located in the town of Harris, Marquette County, Wisconsin, United States. The community was named for James Harris, who became the first postmaster when the community's post office opened in March 1851. Its population was 90 as of the 2020 United States census.

== Education ==
It is in the Westfield School District.
