= Marquette County, Wisconsin =

County in Wisconsin, United States

- County
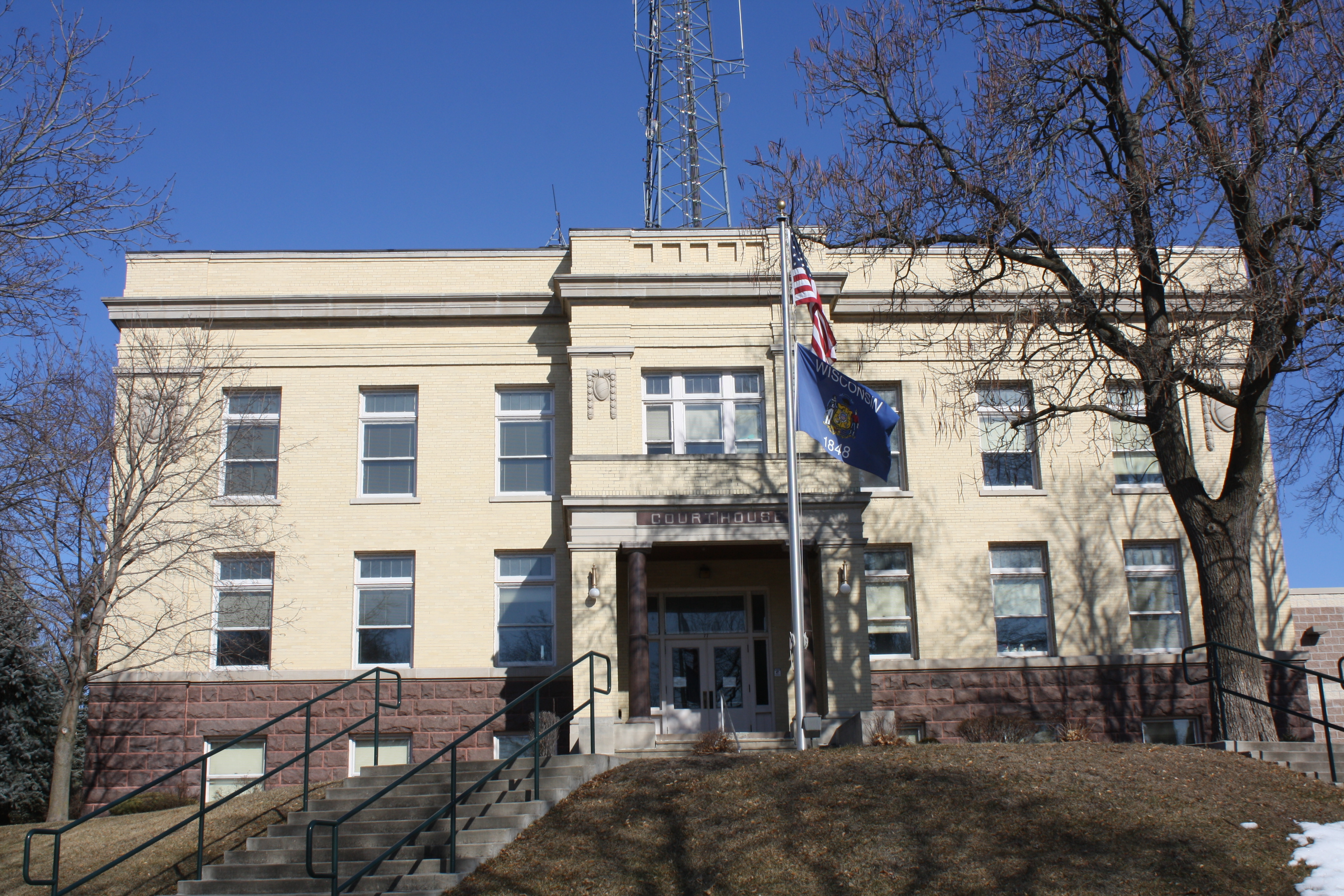
- Marquette County Courthouse

- Location within the U.S. state of Wisconsin
- Coordinates: 43°49′N 89°23′W
- Country: United States
- State: Wisconsin
- Founded: 1848
- Seat: Montello
- Largest city: Montello

Area
  - Total: 464 sq mi (1,200 km^{2})
  - Land: 456 sq mi (1,180 km^{2})
  - Water: 8.7 sq mi (23 km^{2}) 1.9%

Population (2020)
  - Total: 15,592
  - Estimate (2025): 15,927 ▲
  - Density: 35/sq mi (14/km^{2})
- Time zone: UTC−6 (Central)
  - Summer (DST): UTC−5 (CDT)
- Congressional district: 6th
- Website: www.marquettecountywi.gov

Marquette County is a county located in the U.S. state of Wisconsin. As of the 2020 census, the population was 15,592. Its county seat is Montello. The county was created in 1836 from the Wisconsin Territory and organized in 1848. The county is considered a high-recreation retirement destination by the U.S. Department of Agriculture.

== History ==
Naturalist John Muir and his parents first settled in the US in 1849 on a farm in Marquette County. Muir was 11 years old. Part of the land of their farm is reserved in Fountain Lake Farm, listed on the National Register of Historic Places. Muir and his siblings were re-baptized in a nearby lake, known today as Mulhern Lake.

== Geography ==
According to the U.S. Census Bureau, the county has a total area of 464 square miles (1,200 km^{2}), of which 456 square miles (1,180 km^{2}) is land and 8.7 square miles (23 km^{2}) (1.9%) is water. The Mecan River, Buffalo Lake, and Puckaway Lake lie within Marquette County. The highest altitude in the county is a rocky area known as Mt. Shaw.

=== Major highways ===
- Interstate 39
- U.S. Highway 51
- Highway 22 (Wisconsin)
- Highway 23 (Wisconsin)
- Highway 73 (Wisconsin)
- Highway 82 (Wisconsin)

=== Railroads ===
- Union Pacific

=== Adjacent counties ===
- Waushara County - north
- Green Lake County - east
- Columbia County - south
- Adams County - west

=== National protected area ===
- Fox River National Wildlife Refuge

== Demographics ==
Historical population
Census	Pop.	Note	%±
1840	18		—
1850	8,641		47,905.6%
1860	8,233		−4.7%
1870	8,056		−2.1%
1880	8,908		10.6%
1890	9,676		8.6%
1900	10,509		8.6%
1910	10,741		2.2%
1920	10,443		−2.8%
1930	9,388		−10.1%
1940	9,097		−3.1%
1950	8,839		−2.8%
1960	8,516		−3.7%
1970	8,865		4.1%
1980	11,672		31.7%
1990	12,321		5.6%
2000	15,832		28.5%
2010	15,404		−2.7%
2020	15,592		1.2%
2025 (est.)	15,927	▲	2.1%
U.S. Decennial Census; 1790–1960 1900–1990; 1990–2000 2010 2020 2025

=== Racial and ethnic composition ===
Marquette County, Wisconsin – Racial and ethnic composition Note: the US Census treats Hispanic/Latino as an ethnic category. This table excludes Latinos from the racial categories and assigns them to a separate category. Hispanics/Latinos may be of any race.
Race / Ethnicity (NH = Non-Hispanic)	Pop 1980	Pop 1990	Pop 2000	Pop 2010	Pop 2020	% 1980	% 1990	% 2000	% 2010	% 2020
White alone (NH)	11,486	12,074	14,560	14,697	14,477	98.41%	98.00%	91.97%	95.41%	92.85%
Black or African American alone (NH)	25	31	507	75	44	0.21%	0.25%	3.20%	0.49%	0.28%
Native American or Alaska Native alone (NH)	25	45	159	81	60	0.21%	0.37%	1.00%	0.53%	0.38%
Asian alone (NH)	22	18	42	68	51	0.19%	0.15%	0.27%	0.44%	0.33%
Native Hawaiian or Pacific Islander alone (NH)	x	x	11	0	5	x	x	0.07%	0.00%	0.03%
Other race alone (NH)	16	4	6	4	45	0.14%	0.03%	0.04%	0.03%	0.29%
Mixed race or Multiracial (NH)	x	x	126	88	422	x	x	0.80%	0.57%	2.71%
Hispanic or Latino (any race)	98	149	421	391	488	0.84%	1.21%	2.66%	2.54%	3.13%
Total	11,672	12,321	15,832	15,404	15,592	100.00%	100.00%	100.00%	100.00%	100.00%

=== 2020 census ===
As of the 2020 census, the county had a population of 15,592. The median age was 50.2 years. 19.5% of residents were under the age of 18 and 25.5% of residents were 65 years of age or older. For every 100 females there were 104.0 males, and for every 100 females age 18 and over there were 103.5 males age 18 and over.

The population density was 34.2 people per square mile (13.2 people/km^{2}). There were 9,758 housing units at an average density of 21.4 units per square mile (8.3 units/km^{2}), of which 30.6% were vacant. Among occupied housing units, 81.3% were owner-occupied and 18.7% were renter-occupied. The homeowner vacancy rate was 2.1% and the rental vacancy rate was 7.5%.

There were 6,769 households in the county, of which 22.6% had children under the age of 18 living in them. Of all households, 50.6% were married-couple households, 20.8% were households with a male householder and no spouse or partner present, and 20.1% were households with a female householder and no spouse or partner present. About 29.6% of all households were made up of individuals and 15.2% had someone living alone who was 65 years of age or older.

The racial makeup of the county was 94.2% White, 0.3% Black or African American, 0.4% American Indian and Alaska Native, 0.3% Asian, <0.1% Native Hawaiian and Pacific Islander, 1.1% from some other race, and 3.7% from two or more races. Hispanic or Latino residents of any race comprised 3.1% of the population.

<0.1% of residents lived in urban areas, while 100.0% lived in rural areas.

=== 2000 census ===
2000 Census age pyramid for Marquette County

As of the census of 2000, there were 15,832 people, 5,986 households, and 4,166 families residing in the county. The population density was 35 people per square mile (14 people/km^{2}). There were 8,664 housing units at an average density of 19 units per square mile (7.3 units/km^{2}). The racial makeup of the county was 93.66% White, 3.44% Black or African American, 1.04% Native American, 0.27% Asian, 0.10% Pacific Islander, 0.38% from other races, and 1.11% from two or more races. 2.66% of the population were Hispanic or Latino of any race. 45.7% were of German, 8.2% Irish, 6.9% Polish, 6.1% English, 5.6% Norwegian and 5.1% American ancestry. 94.8% spoke English, 2.8% Spanish and 1.1% German as their first language.

There were 5,986 households, out of which 26.90% had children under the age of 18 living with them, 58.70% were married couples living together, 6.70% had a female householder with no husband present, and 30.40% were non-families. 25.40% of all households were made up of individuals, and 12.30% had someone living alone who was 65 years of age or older. The average household size was 2.41 and the average family size was 2.86.

In the county, the population was spread out, with 21.10% under the age of 18, 6.70% from 18 to 24, 28.90% from 25 to 44, 25.00% from 45 to 64, and 18.30% who were 65 years of age or older. The median age was 41 years. For every 100 females there were 118.90 males. For every 100 females age 18 and over, there were 123.70 males.

In 2017, there were 133 births, giving a general fertility rate of 65.1 births per 1000 women aged 15–44, the 29th highest rate out of all 72 Wisconsin counties. Of these, 11 of the births occurred at home.

== Communities ==
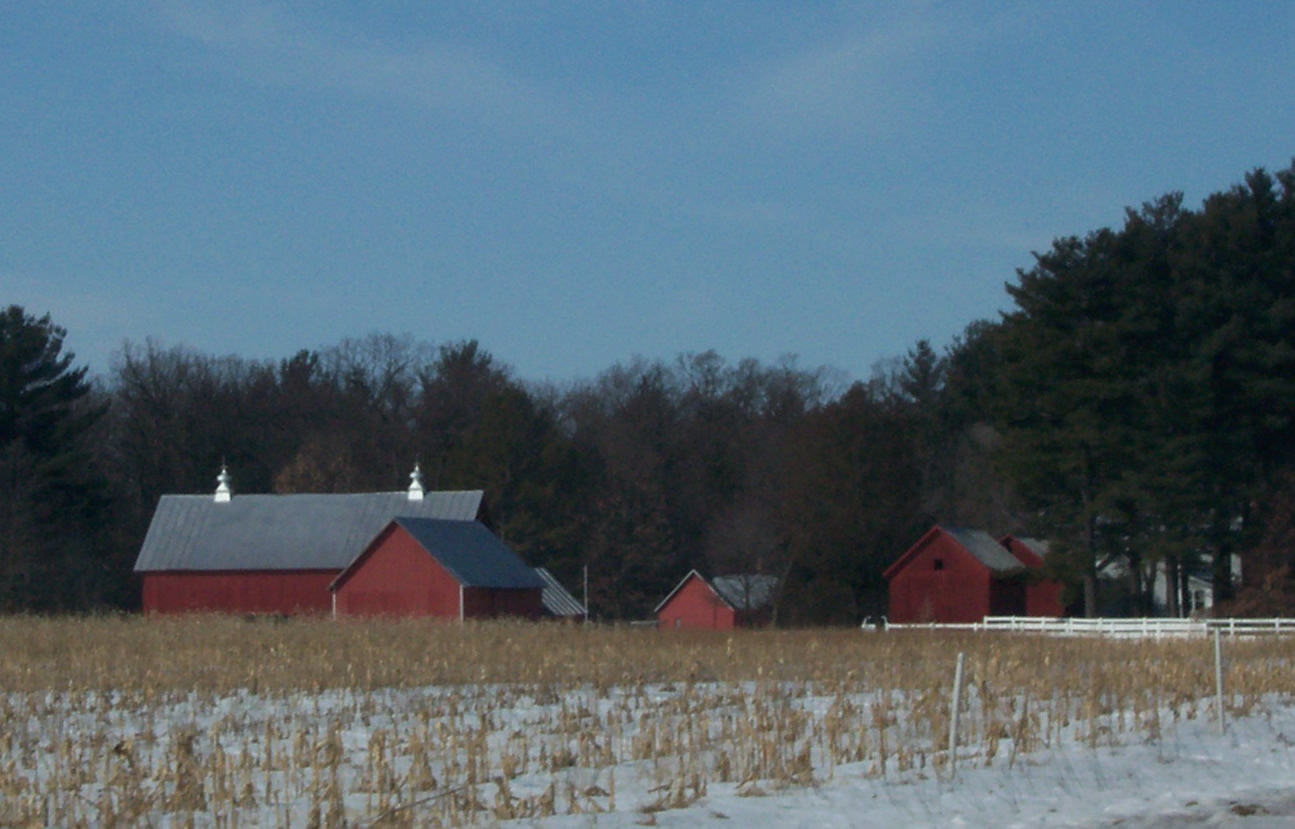
Farming in rural Marquette County

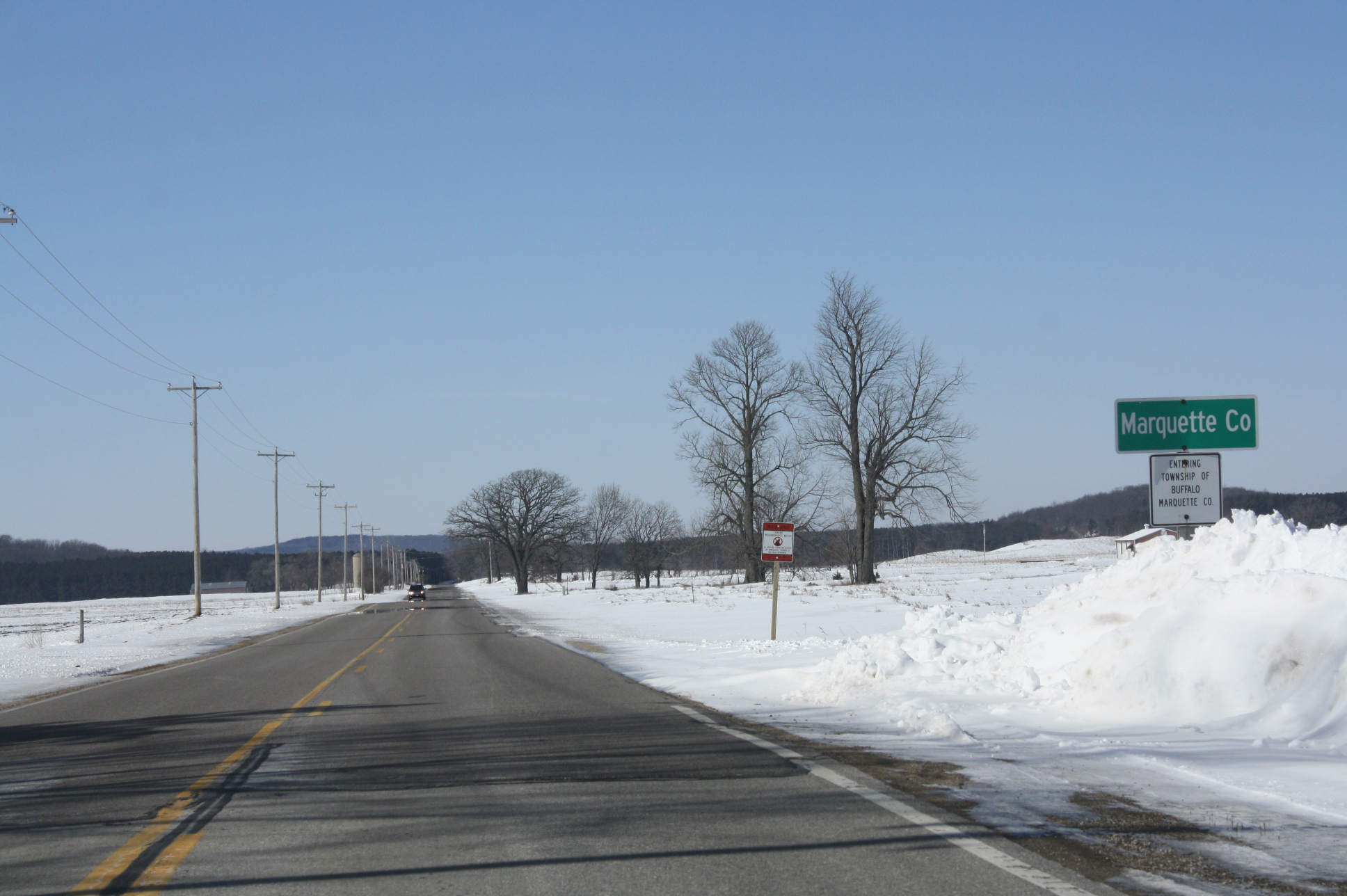
Welcome sign

=== City ===
- Montello (county seat)

=== Villages ===
- Endeavor
- Neshkoro
- Oxford
- Westfield

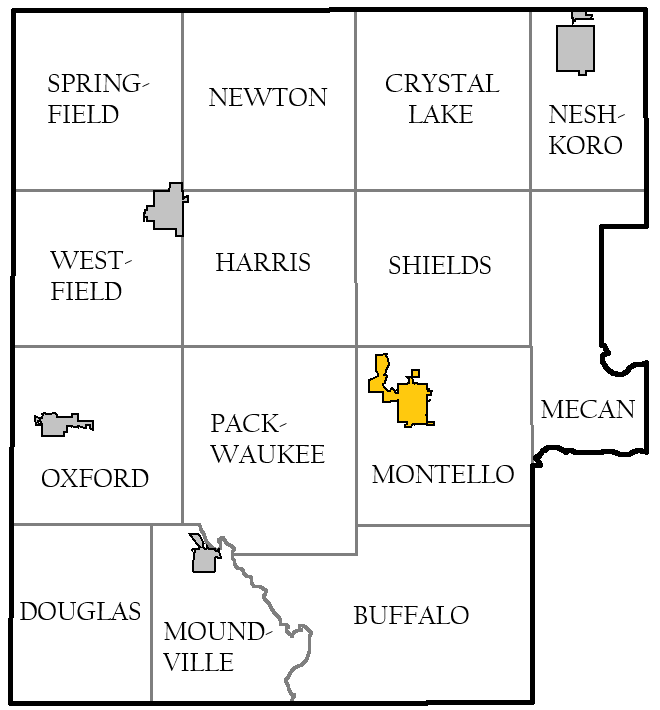
Towns of Marquette County

=== Towns ===
- Buffalo
- Crystal Lake
- Douglas
- Harris
- Mecan
- Montello
- Moundville
- Neshkoro
- Newton
- Oxford
- Packwaukee
- Shields
- Springfield
- Westfield

=== Census-designated place ===
- Briggsville
- Harrisville
- Packwaukee

=== Unincorporated communities ===
- Budsin
- Buffalo Shore Estates
- Douglas Center
- Germania
- Glen Oak
- Harrisville
- Lawrence
- Mecan

== Politics ==
United States presidential election results for Marquette County, Wisconsin
Year	Republican		Democratic		Third party(ies)	
Year	No.	%	No.	%	No.	%
1892	877	41.10%	1,198	56.14%	59	2.76%
1896	1,476	62.84%	827	35.21%	46	1.96%
1900	1,560	63.08%	866	35.02%	47	1.90%
1904	1,604	65.47%	752	30.69%	94	3.84%
1908	1,555	64.42%	798	33.06%	61	2.53%
1912	881	39.42%	923	41.30%	431	19.28%
1916	1,377	58.75%	923	39.38%	44	1.88%
1920	2,436	76.22%	687	21.50%	73	2.28%
1924	1,109	31.19%	587	16.51%	1,860	52.31%
1928	2,554	65.44%	1,313	33.64%	36	0.92%
1932	1,365	34.80%	2,504	63.84%	53	1.35%
1936	1,957	49.96%	1,812	46.26%	148	3.78%
1940	3,086	71.57%	1,195	27.71%	31	0.72%
1944	2,853	73.47%	1,016	26.17%	14	0.36%
1948	2,033	64.21%	1,095	34.59%	38	1.20%
1952	3,379	80.11%	835	19.80%	4	0.09%
1956	2,796	73.87%	975	25.76%	14	0.37%
1960	2,947	70.12%	1,249	29.72%	7	0.17%
1964	1,881	49.29%	1,927	50.50%	8	0.21%
1968	2,374	61.15%	1,228	31.63%	280	7.21%
1972	2,682	62.61%	1,537	35.88%	65	1.52%
1976	2,607	50.05%	2,516	48.30%	86	1.65%
1980	3,166	54.78%	2,180	37.72%	433	7.49%
1984	3,406	61.79%	2,032	36.87%	74	1.34%
1988	3,059	54.95%	2,463	44.24%	45	0.81%
1992	2,322	34.55%	2,533	37.69%	1,865	27.75%
1996	2,208	36.08%	2,859	46.72%	1,052	17.19%
2000	3,522	48.96%	3,437	47.78%	235	3.27%
2004	4,604	54.31%	3,785	44.65%	88	1.04%
2008	3,654	46.57%	4,068	51.85%	124	1.58%
2012	3,992	49.25%	4,014	49.52%	99	1.22%
2016	4,709	59.68%	2,808	35.58%	374	4.74%
2020	5,719	63.09%	3,239	35.73%	107	1.18%
2024	6,041	64.08%	3,252	34.50%	134	1.42%

Between 1964 and 2016, Marquette County supported the nationwide winner in every election except for 1976, and even then, the county backed Gerald Ford by only a 91-vote and sub-2% margin. In 2020, Donald Trump received the highest share of the vote for any candidate in the county since 1960 and won by an even bigger margin in 2024.

== Education ==
School districts include:

- Markesan School District
- Montello School District
- Portage Community School District
- Princeton School District
- School District of Westfield
- School District of Wisconsin Dells

== See also ==
- National Register of Historic Places listings in Marquette County, Wisconsin
- Fountain Lake Farm
