= Wisconsin's Marquette County Assembly district =

Former American legislative district

Wisconsin's Marquette County State Assembly district
- Obsolete
- Notes: 1848–1852; 1861–1882

Wisconsin's Marquette County Assembly district was a district in the Wisconsin State Assembly in the early years of the history of the state of Wisconsin, prior to the legislative redistricting reforms of 1972 which created the current numbered districts. Located in central Wisconsin, the district comprised the whole of Marquette County, Wisconsin, and was one of the 66 original Assembly districts defined in Article XIV of the Constitution of Wisconsin.

The district was in use for elections from 1848 through 1851, then again from 1861 to 1881. By 1850, the territory originally belonging to Marquette County had been divided into Marquette and Waushara counties, but the Assembly district boundaries did not change until redistricting abolished the district in 1852. When the district was re-created in 1861, it contained only the modern boundaries of Marquette County.

== List of representatives ==
List of representatives from the Marquette County district
Member	Party	Residence	Term start	Term end	Leg.
District created
Archibald Nichols	Whig	Markesan	June 5, 1848	January 1, 1849	1st
Satterlee Clark	Dem.	Green Lake	January 1, 1849	January 7, 1850	2nd
Benjamin Spaulding	F.S.	Arcade	January 7, 1850	January 6, 1851	3rd
Charles Waldo	Whig	Kingston	January 6, 1851	January 5, 1852	4th
Eleazer Root	Whig	Dartford	January 5, 1852	January 3, 1853	5th
District abolished by 1852 Wisconsin Act 499; Marquette County divided into the Marquette–Waushara 1st and Marquette–Waushara 2nd districts Waushara County became part of the Marquette–Waushara 2nd district
District re-established by 1861 Wisconsin Act 216
Horatio S. Thomas	Dem.	Briggsville	January 6, 1862	January 4, 1864	15th 16th
Robert Cochran	Dem.	Westfield	January 4, 1864	January 2, 1865	17th
Spencer A. Pease	Dem.	Montello	January 2, 1865	January 7, 1867	18th 19th
Charles S. Kelsey	Union	Montello	January 7, 1867	January 6, 1868	20th
Francis Russell	Dem.	Westfield	January 6, 1868	January 4, 1869	21st
William Murphy	Dem.	Briggsville	January 4, 1869	January 3, 1870	22nd
Spencer A. Pease	Dem.	Montello	January 3, 1870	January 1, 1872	23rd 24th
Neil Dimond	Dem.	Buffalo	January 1, 1872	January 6, 1873	25th
Charles S. Kelsey	Rep.	Montello	January 6, 1873	January 5, 1874	26th
William Murphy	Dem.	Douglas	January 5, 1874	January 4, 1875	27th
Robert Mitchell	Rep.	Douglas	January 4, 1875	January 3, 1876	28th
B. Frank Goodell	Dem.·	Montello	January 3, 1876	January 1, 1877	29th
Samuel Crockett	Dem.	Westfield	January 1, 1877	January 7, 1878	30th
William H. Peters	Dem.	Montello	January 7, 1878	January 6, 1879	31st
James W. Murphy	Dem.	Briggsville	January 6, 1879	January 5, 1880	32nd
Charles S. Kelsey	Rep.	Montello	January 5, 1880	January 3, 1881	33rd
C. F. Roskie	Ind.R.	Montello	January 3, 1881	January 2, 1882	34th
Samuel Tanner	Dem.	Westfield	January 2, 1882	January 1, 1883	35th
District abolished by 1882 Wisconsin Act 242; Marquette County became part of the Adams–Marquette district
