= Charles S. Kelsey =

19th century American politician, member of the Wisconsin State Senate and Assembly

Charles S.d Kelsey

Member of the Wisconsin Senate from the 29th district
- In office January 9, 1861 – January 11, 1865
- Preceded by: M. W. Seely
- Succeeded by: G. DeWitt Elwood

Member of the Wisconsin State Assembly from the Marquette district
- In office January 14, 1880 – January 12, 1881
- Preceded by: James W. Murphy
- Succeeded by: C. F. Roskie
- In office January 8, 1873 – January 14, 1874
- Preceded by: Neil Dimond
- Succeeded by: William Murphy
- In office January 9, 1867 – January 8, 1868
- Preceded by: Spencer A. Pease
- Succeeded by: Francis Russell

Personal details
- Born: Charles Sheffield Kelsey; October 7, 1822 Perry, New York, U.S.
- Died: June 18, 1901 (aged 78)
- Party: Republican; National Union (1862-1868)
- Spouse: Lucretia Bacon (m. 1840; died 1869)
- Children: Winfield B. Kelsey^{(b. 1851; died 1890)}; Otto Goodell Kelsey^{(b. 1852; died 1934)}; Julia Kelsey; Charles Edwin Kelsey^{(b. 1861; died 1936)}
- Parents: Solomon Kelsey (father); Virtue (Record) Kelsey (mother)
- Relatives: William H. Kelsey (brother); Edwin B. Kelsey (brother)
- Profession: mechanic, politician

Charles Sheffield Kelsey (October 7, 1822 – June 18, 1901) was an American mechanic, printer, and politician. He represented Marquette County as a member of the Wisconsin State Senate and the Wisconsin State Assembly.

== Biography ==
Kelsey was born on October 7, 1822, in Perry, New York. His older brother, William H. Kelsey, was a member of the United States House of Representatives and his younger brother, Edwin B. Kelsey, was also a member of the Assembly and the Senate.

Before moving to Montello, Wisconsin, in 1854, Kelsey married Lucretia Bacon in 1840. They had four children before her death in 1869. Among them were Otto Kelsey, who became a member of the New York State Assembly, and Julia Kelsey, who became Postmistress of Montello.

== Career ==
Kelsey was a member of the Senate from 1862 to 1864 and of the Assembly in 1867, 1873 and 1880. He was a Republican before and after the American Civil War, but was elected on the National Union Party ticket for his 1863–1864 senate term and his 1867 assembly term.

Kelsey died in Montello on June 18, 1901, and his remains were taken to Geneseo, New York, for burial.
