= Westfield, Wisconsin (disambiguation) =

There are three places named Westfield in the U.S. state of Wisconsin:

- Westfield, Marquette County, Wisconsin
- Westfield, Sauk County, Wisconsin
- Westfield, Wisconsin village in Marquette County
