= Robert Mitchell (Wisconsin politician) =

19th century American doctor and politician

Member of the Wisconsin State Assembly from the Marquette district
- In office January 4, 1875 – January 3, 1876
- Preceded by: William Murphy
- Succeeded by: B. Frank Goodell

Personal details
- Born: June 22, 1826 Moravia, New York, U.S.
- Died: June 21, 1899 (aged 72) Portage, Wisconsin, U.S.
- Resting place: Briggsville Protestant Cemetery, Briggsville, Wisconsin
- Party: Republican
- Spouse: Abby O. Briggs (m. 1867–1899)
- Children: Robert B. Mitchell
- Education: Geneva Medical College; University of Buffalo
- Profession: Physician

Military service
- Allegiance: United States
- Branch/service: United States Volunteers; Union Army
- Years of service: 1861–1865
- Rank: Surgeon, USV
- Unit: 10th Reg. Wisconsin Volunteer Infantry; 27th Reg. Wisconsin Volunteer Infantry
- Battles/wars: American Civil War

Robert Mitchell (June 22, 1826 – June 21, 1899) was an American medical doctor, farmer, and Republican politician. He served one term in the Wisconsin State Assembly, representing Marquette County, and was a Union Army surgeon throughout the American Civil War.

== Background ==
Mitchell was born in Moravia, New York, on June 22, 1826. He graduated from Geneva Medical College in 1845 and the University of Buffalo in 1850. He became a physician and farmer.

== In Wisconsin; the war and after ==
Mitchell moved to Wisconsin in 1857, having spent some months in Iowa and three years in California. He went into medical practice in Portage City. During the American Civil War, Mitchell was the assistant surgeon of the 10th Wisconsin Infantry Regiment for two years and was at the Battles of Perryville and Stones River. He then became surgeon of the 27th Wisconsin Volunteers. He was at the Battle of Jenkins' Ferry and at the siege of Mobile.

After the war, Mitchell resumed practice in Portage. He married Abby Briggs in 1867. They moved to Douglas in Marquette County in 1869 where he became a full-time farmer for some time. They returned to Portage in 1893.

== Public office ==
Mitchell served as chairman of the town board in the Town of Douglass. In 1874, he was elected to represent Marquette County in the Assembly's 1875 session, receiving 776 votes to 654 for Democrat Neil Dimond. Democratic incumbent William Murphy was not a candidate for re-election. Mitchell was assigned to the standing committees on the militia (which he chaired) and medical societies. He was to the joint committee on claims as well.

Mitchell was defeated when he ran for re-election in the 1876 assembly, with 507 votes to 673 for Democrat B. Frank Goodell.

He ran once more for the Assembly, seeking election as a Democrat for the 1879 session, but lost with 718 votes to 953 for James W. Murphy (also a Democrat) and 69 votes for Greenbacker O. C. Pomeroy.

Mitchell spent many years on the Board of Examining Surgeons for the United States Pension Department in Portage, retaining that position through several changes of national government. He died in Portage on June 21, 1899.
