= Samuel Crockett (Wisconsin politician) =

19th century American politician

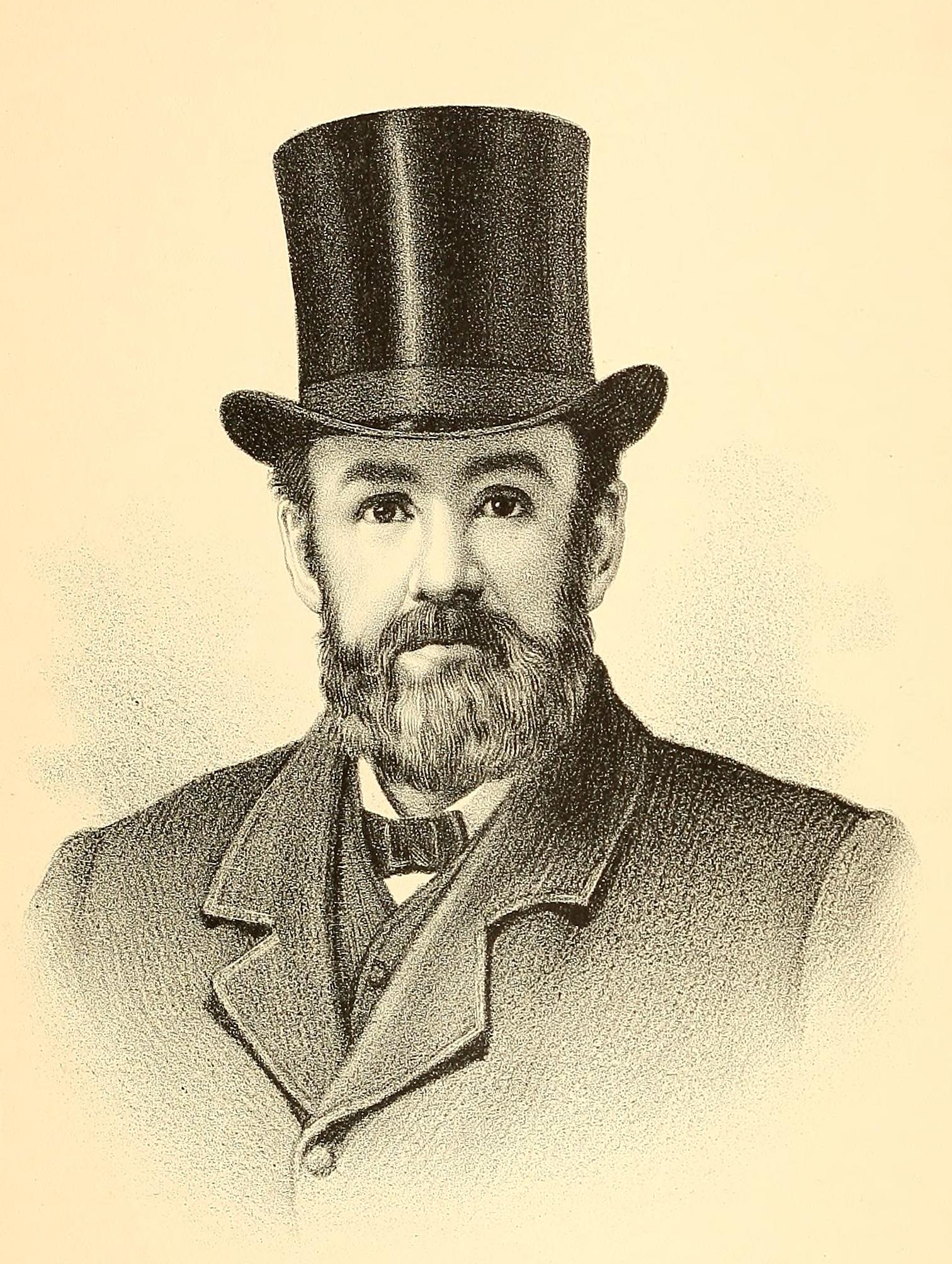
- From Portrait and Biographical Album of Green Lake, Marquette, and Waushara counties, Wisconsin (1890)

Member of the Wisconsin State Assembly from the Marquette district
- In office January 1, 1877 – January 7, 1878
- Preceded by: B. Frank Goodell
- Succeeded by: William H. Peters

Personal details
- Born: May 10, 1821 Manchester, England, UK
- Died: September 19, 1900 (aged 79) Westfield, Wisconsin, U.S.
- Resting place: Westfield South Cemetery, Westfield, Wisconsin
- Party: Democratic
- Spouse: Eliza Snyder (m. 1852)
- Children: John S. Crockett^{(b. 1855; died 1864)}; George Byron Crockett^{(b. 1858; died 1930)}; Arrabell Crockett^{(b. 1862; died 1863)}; Ethel L. Crockett^{(b. 1884; died 1891)}
- Occupation: tailor, merchant

Samuel Crockett (May 10, 1821 – September 19, 1900) was an English American immigrant, businessman, Democratic politician, and Wisconsin pioneer. He served in the Wisconsin State Assembly, representing Marquette County during the 1877 session.

== Biography ==
Samuel Crockett was born in Manchester, England, in May 1821. As a child, he was present at the opening of the Liverpool and Manchester Railway, the first steam-powered railroad in the world. He received a common school education until age 13, when he went to work as an auxiliary at the Manchester Royal Infirmary. Three years later, he secured an apprenticeship as a tailor, which he followed to completion.

He emigrated to the United States in 1843, settling first in Utica, New York, then later in New York City, and Stewartsville, New Jersey, where he was married. During these years, he worked as a journeyman tailor at various locations in the states of New York, Pennsylvania, and New Jersey.

Crockett determined to move to the west in 1856 to seek better opportunities. He arrived in Wisconsin in May 1856, and settled at Westfield, in Marquette County, where he resumed his work as a merchant tailor. He switched to a general merchandise trade in 1859, opening the first general store in Westfield. He was very successful in his business career and was one of the wealthiest and best-known residents of Marquette County in the late 19th century.

Crockett was a staunch Democrat throughout his political career. He served eight terms as coroner of Marquette County, serving from 1856 to 1874, and was justice of the peace for 25 years. He was elected to the Wisconsin State Assembly in the Fall of 1876 and served in the 1877 session. At the time, his district comprised all of Marquette County.

Crockett died at his home in Westfield in September 1900.

== Personal life and family ==
Samuel Crockett was one of thirteen children born to Thomas and Sarah (née Goodall) Crockett. Samuel was the only member of his family to emigrate from England.

Samuel Crockett married Eliza Snyder, the daughter of Frederick Snyder. Frederick Snyder was one of the first settlers at Stewartsville, New Jersey, and a descendant of early Dutch colonists in America. Samuel and Eliza had four children together, though all but one died in childhood. Their only surviving child was George Byron Crockett.

== Electoral history ==
=== Wisconsin Assembly (1877) ===
Wisconsin Assembly, Marquette District Election 1876
Party	Candidate	Votes	%	±%
General Election, November 7, 1876
Democratic	Samuel Crockett	997	55.33%	−1.71%
Republican	Andrew Scobie	805	44.67%	
Plurality		192	10.65%	-3.41%
Total votes		1,802	100.0%	+52.71%
Democratic hold				

Wisconsin State Assembly
Preceded by B. Frank Goodell	Members of the Wisconsin State Assembly from the Marquette district January 1, 1877 – January 7, 1878	Succeeded by William H. Peters
