= Samuel Crockett =

Samuel Crockett may refer to:

- S. R. Crockett (Samuel Rutherford Crockett, 1860–1914), Scottish novelist
- Samuel Crockett (Wisconsin politician) (1821–1900), American politician in Wisconsin
- Samuel T. Crockett (1890–1946), member of the Virginia Senate
