= Robert M. Long =

American politician

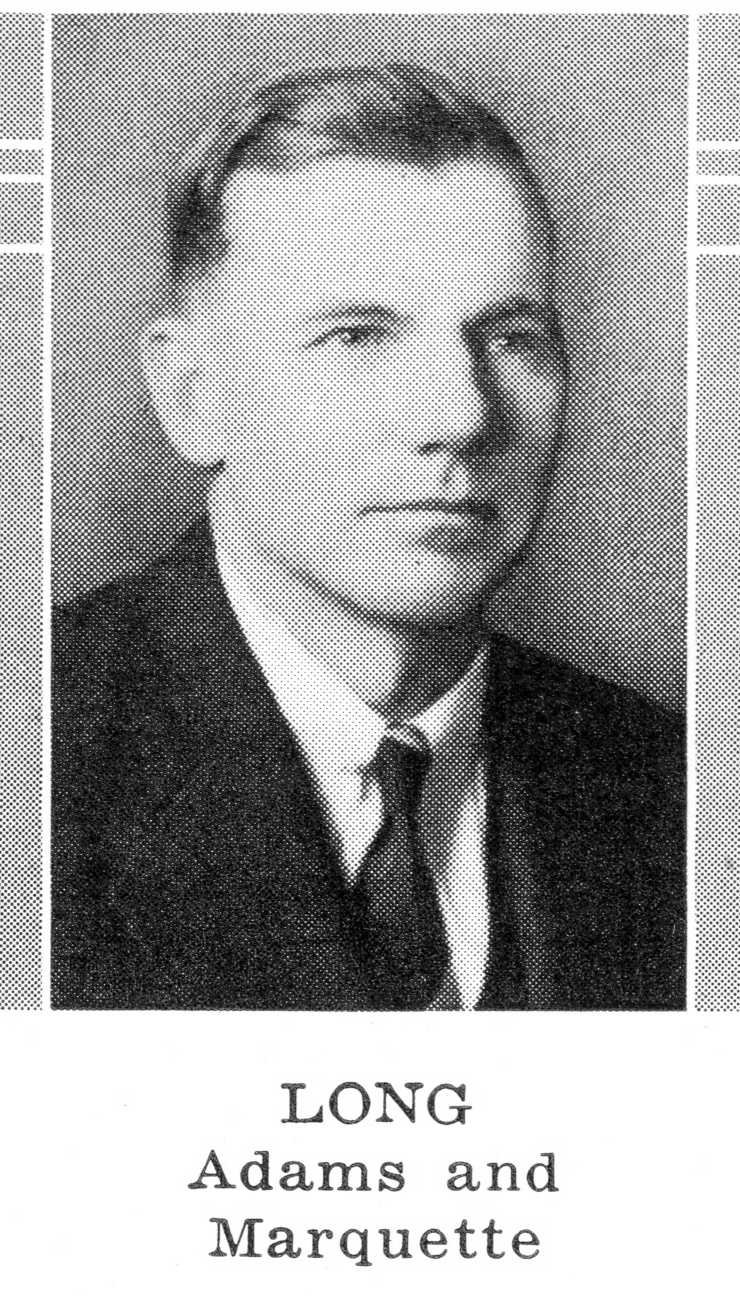
Robert M. Long

Robert M. Long was a member of the Wisconsin State Assembly.

== Biography ==
Long was born on April 9, 1895, in Westfield, Wisconsin. He died in October 1977.

== Career ==
Long was a member of the Assembly from 1939 to 1946. Additionally, he was chairman (similar to mayor) of Westfield, Marquette County, Wisconsin, and of the Marquette County, Wisconsin Board of Supervisors. He was a Republican.

== See also ==
- The Political Graveyard
