= Greg Dean Schmitz =

American writer (born 1970)

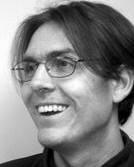
- Schmitz in 2004
- Born: August 18, 1970 (age 56); Falmouth, Massachusetts, U.S.
- Occupation: Online film journalist

Greg Dean Schmitz (born August 18, 1970) is an American online film critic known for his movie news website, Upcomingmovies.com (1997 to 2002), and its second version as Greg's Previews of Upcoming Movies as part of Yahoo! Movies (2002 to 2007). Schmitz is currently the weekly columnist of The Weekly Ketchup for Rotten Tomatoes and a contributing columnist for Fandango.

== Life and career ==
Schmitz was born in Falmouth, Massachusetts, the son of an Air Force weatherman, and as a child also lived in Satellite Beach, Florida. Schmitz graduated from high school in Westfield, Wisconsin in 1988, and then moved to Tampa, Florida, where he received a master's degree in Library Science from the University of South Florida in 1995. During his time in Tampa, Schmitz was active in campus activities, which included co-running WBUL, the largest student-run radio station in Florida, and running for student body president in 1993. After college, Schmitz's career as a public reference librarian began with two years at the Okefenokee Regional Library System in Waycross, Georgia from 1995 to 1997, and continued at the Oshkosh Public Library in Oshkosh, Wisconsin from 1997 to 1999. During this time, he was also active in the group of comic fans behind the Women in Refrigerators documentation.

== Websites ==
On August 14, 1997, Schmitz created a GeoCities website called Bookhouse's Previews of Upcoming Movies as a way to avoid having to repeat the same information in chat rooms and message boards when people would ask questions about movies that had not been released yet, or that were rumored to be at some stage of development in Hollywood. The site quickly outgrew GeoCities, and was re-launched under the name of Upcomingmovies.com in early 1998. By October 1999, the site was earning enough of an income from advertising that Schmitz was able to quit his day job as a librarian. In 2001, Schmitz teamed up with Yahoo! Movies, bringing the site there under the new name of Greg's Previews of Upcoming Movies. Schmitz also moved to Santa Monica, California as part of the change, and during his time in California, he co-starred in a television pilot for MGM Television called The Movie Fan Show, was frequently quoted in publications like USA Today and The Chicago Sun-Times, and made several radio appearances, including The Howard Stern Show.

In May 2003, Schmitz became ill and was diagnosed with hereditary haemochromatosis, a genetic disorder which had been poisoning Schmitz's internal organs since birth, resulting in over a dozen disorders. As Schmitz's conditions worsened, his ability to continue working on the site, which had previously been a 60+ hour job, declined. In 2007, Schmitz's contract with Yahoo! Movies ended, and online publication of Greg's Previews of Upcoming Movies was halted. Schmitz's health improved, and in January 2008, Schmitz began writing online again as a weekly columnist for Rotten Tomatoes, and in May 2008, began writing as a contributing columnist for Fandango.
