= James F. McDowell (Wisconsin politician) =

American politician

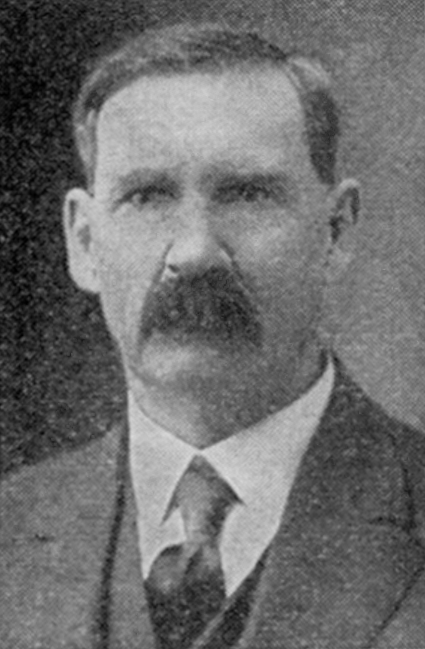

Member of the Wisconsin State Assembly
- In office 1919–1919
- In office 1921–1921

Personal details
- Born: May 27, 1862 Packwaukee, Wisconsin, US
- Died: December 19, 1938 (aged 76) Milwaukee, Wisconsin, US
- Party: Republican

James F. McDowell (1862–1938) was a member of the Wisconsin State Assembly.

== Biography ==
McDowell was born in Packwaukee, Wisconsin on May 27, 1862. He attended what are now the University of Wisconsin–Oshkosh and Valparaiso University. In 1914, he settled in Montello, Wisconsin. He died on December 19, 1938, in Milwaukee.

== Career ==
McDowell was a member of the Assembly during the 1919 and 1921 sessions. Additionally, he was Superintendent of Schools of Marquette County, Wisconsin from 1895 to 1901 and Deputy Clerk of the Circuit Court of Marquette County from 1915 to 1919. He was a Republican.
