= Edwin B. Kelsey =

American politician, lawyer, and businessman

Edwin Bolivar Kelsey (May 13, 1826 – February 2, 1861) was an American politician, lawyer, and businessman.

Born in Perry, New York, Kelsey was trained to be a printer. In 1848, he moved to Wisconsin and settled in Waukesha, Wisconsin, where he studied law and was admitted to the Wisconsin Bar. Kelsey moved to Montello, Wisconsin. There Kelsey was in the lumber, banking, merchandise, mill businesses. In 1853, he served in the Wisconsin State Assembly and then served in the Wisconsin State Senate in 1855–1856. In 1858, Kelsey lived in New York City and took care of business. His brothers were William H. Kelsey, who served in the United States House of Representatives, and Charles S. Kelsey, who also served in the Senate and the Assembly. A nephew, Otto Kelsey, was a member of the New York State Assembly. He died in Montello, Wisconsin.
