= James W. Murphy (politician) =

American politician

James W. Murphy (September 27, 1852 – December 25, 1913) was an American merchant, farmer and politician who served as a Democratic member of the Wisconsin State Assembly from Marquette County and of the Wisconsin State Senate from Milwaukee County.

== Background ==
Born in Little Falls, New York, he came to Briggsville, Wisconsin with his family in 1854. He graduated from the University of Notre Dame in June 1868, and moved to Milwaukee, where he lived for several years before returning to Briggsville. He became a merchant and farmer. As of 1879, he had held the offices of town clerk and town supervisor, and was chairman of the Marquette County board of supervisors.

== Assembly and Senate ==
He was elected to the Assembly for 1879 to represent Marquette County to succeed fellow Democrat William H. Peters, receiving 953 votes against 718 for former Republican Assemblyman Robert Mitchell (running as a Democrat) and 69 for Greenbacker 0. C. Pomeroy. At that time he was the youngest man ever elected to the Assembly. He did not run for re-election, and was succeeded by Republican Charles S. Kelsey.

Murphy served fifteen years as chairman of the central committee of the Wisconsin Democratic Party, and was elected in 1890 as president of the Jefferson Club - the largest Democratic club in the old Northwest Territory. He was appointed a post office inspector in June 1885, serving until July 1889.

He was elected to the Wisconsin State Senate from the Fourth District in 1892, with 5,215 votes to 4,824 for Republican ex-Congressman Isaac W. Van Schaick, 98 for Prohibitionist William Bendile, and 86 for Meschaff, Populist. In September 1893 he was appointed the United States Collector of Internal Revenue for the First (eastern) District of Wisconsin. He resigned his Senate seat, and was succeeded by Republican James C. Officer.

He moved to Colorado in 1900, and died there on December 25, 1913 at the home of his son W. A. Murphy, leaving behind a widow, two sons and a daughter.

He is not the same person as James William Murphy, mayor of Platteville, Wisconsin and member of the United States House of Representatives.
