= Montello Commercial Historic District =

Historic district in Wisconsin, United States

- U.S. National Register of Historic Places
- U.S. Historic district
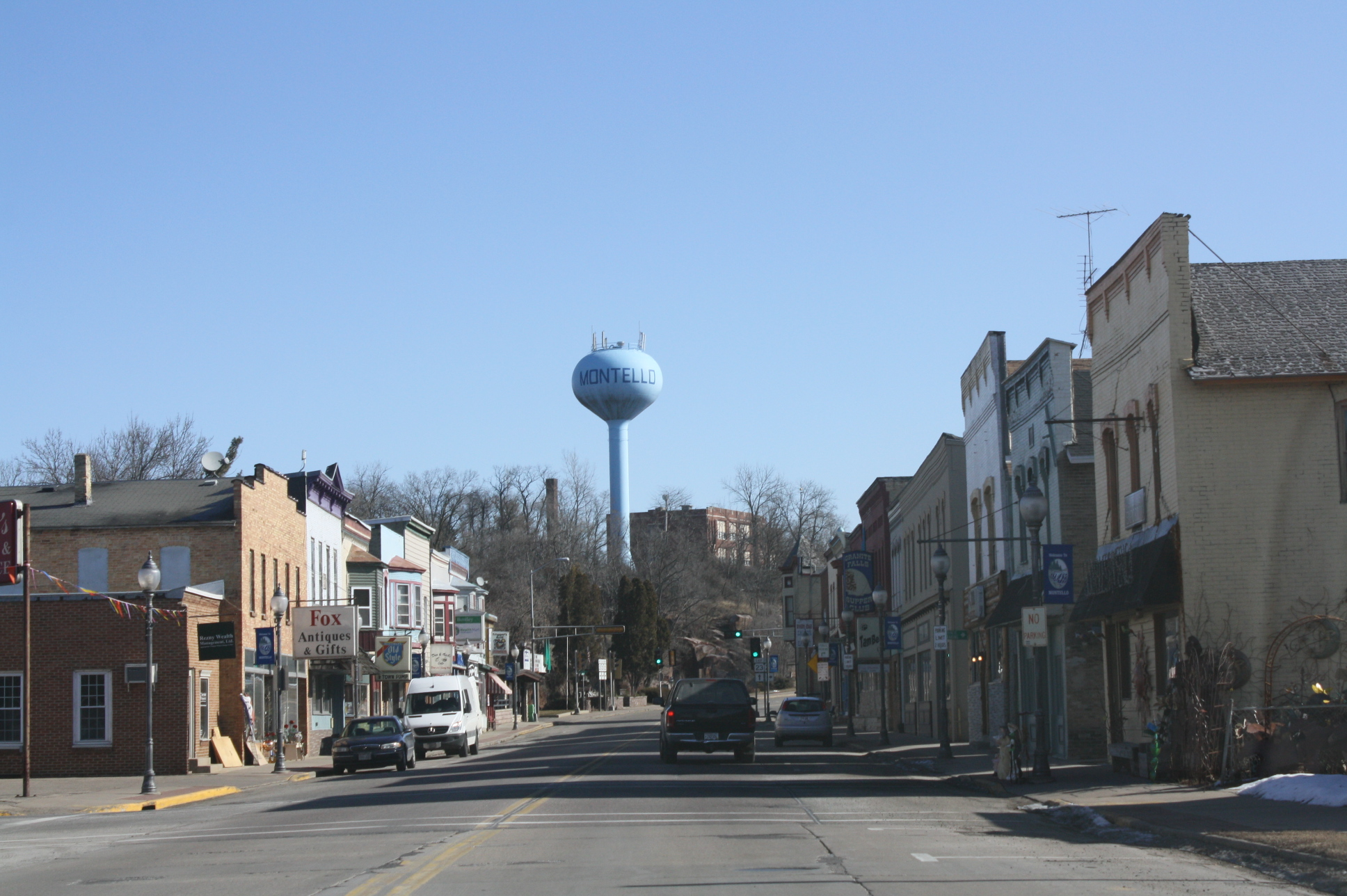
- Looking east
- Location: Montello, Wisconsin
- NRHP reference No.: 96000238
- Added to NRHP: March 7, 1996

The Montello Commercial Historic District is located in Montello, Wisconsin. It was added to the National Register of Historic Places in 1996.

== History ==
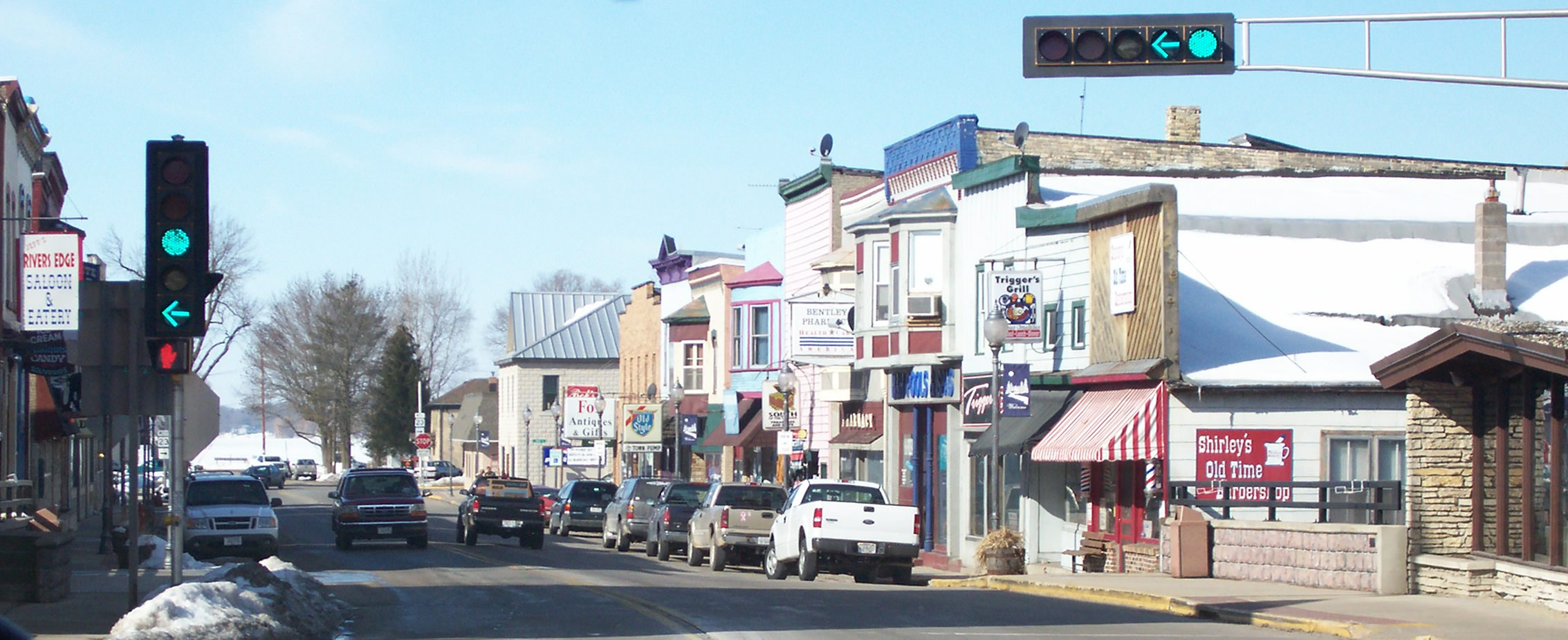
Looking west

The land that the district now sits on was once home to the Ho-Chunk and the Menominee. Among the businesses that sprung up in the district was what became the Montello Granite Company. Granite from Montello would be used to construct several monuments and memorials to the soldiers of the American Civil War. It was also used to build the tombs of U.S. President Ulysses S. Grant and his wife, Julia Grant.
