= Montello, Wisconsin =

- City
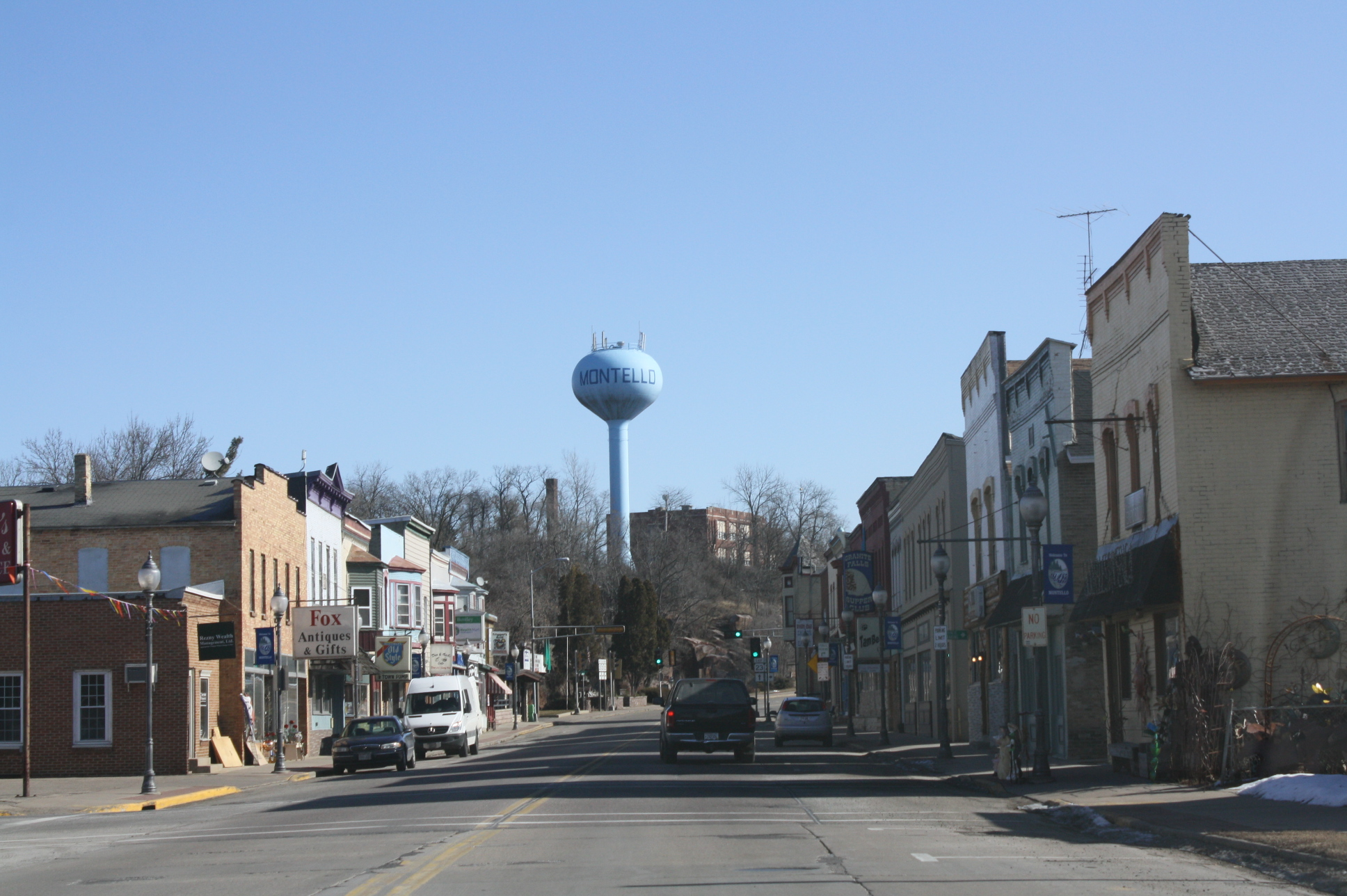
- Looking east at downtown Montello's Commercial Historic District

- Location of Montello in Marquette County, Wisconsin

- Location within Wisconsin Location within the United States
- Coordinates: 43°47′31″N 89°19′47″W
- Country: United States
- State: Wisconsin
- County: Marquette

Government
  - Mayor: Jim Houdek

Area
  - Total: 2.20 sq mi (5.70 km^{2})
  - Land: 1.96 sq mi (5.07 km^{2})
  - Water: 0.24 sq mi (0.62 km^{2})

Population (2020)
  - Total: 1,448
  - Density: 740/sq mi (286/km^{2})
- Time zone: UTC-6 (Central (CST))
  - Summer (DST): UTC-5 (CDT)
- ZIP codes: 53949
- Area code: 608
- FIPS code: 55-53875
- Website: https://www.cityofmontello.com/

Montello is a city in and the county seat of Marquette County, Wisconsin, United States. The population was 1,448 at the 2020 census. The Fox River flows through the city. Montello is home to the largest tree in Wisconsin. A notable attraction in the city is the former granite quarry, which has been transformed into a park with several waterfalls. The Montello post office was established in 1850, and still operates today with the zip code 53949.

== Geography ==
According to the United States Census Bureau, the city has a total area of 2.15 square miles (5.57 km^{2}), of which 1.91 square miles (4.95 km^{2}) is land and 0.24 square miles (0.62 km^{2}) is water.

The Fox River flows from east through the middle of Montello. There is a dam in Montello, and the upstream portion of the river to the west of the dam is called Buffalo Lake.

The Montello River flows from the north, meeting the Fox at the south end of Montello. The upstream portion of the river above the other dam is Montello Lake.

== Climate ==
According to the Köppen Climate Classification system, Montello has a warm-summer humid continental climate, abbreviated "Dfb" on climate maps. The hottest temperature recorded in Montello was 104 °F (40.0 °C) on July 14, 1995 and July 6, 2012, while the coldest temperature recorded was −35 °F (−37.2 °C) on January 15, 1963 and January 9, 1977.

Climate data for Montello, Wisconsin, 1991–2020 normals, extremes 1908–present
Month	Jan	Feb	Mar	Apr	May	Jun	Jul	Aug	Sep	Oct	Nov	Dec	Year
Record high °F (°C)	56 (13)	72 (22)	84 (29)	92 (33)	100 (38)	102 (39)	105 (41)	103 (39)	101 (38)	88 (31)	78 (26)	65 (18)	105 (41)
Mean maximum °F (°C)	45.3 (7.4)	51.5 (10.8)	66.3 (19.1)	79.0 (26.1)	86.5 (30.3)	90.7 (32.6)	92.2 (33.4)	90.5 (32.5)	86.0 (30.0)	79.5 (26.4)	64.3 (17.9)	50.5 (10.3)	94.5 (34.7)
Mean daily maximum °F (°C)	26.2 (−3.2)	31.0 (−0.6)	42.6 (5.9)	55.9 (13.3)	68.5 (20.3)	77.6 (25.3)	81.5 (27.5)	79.6 (26.4)	72.3 (22.4)	59.3 (15.2)	44.3 (6.8)	31.5 (−0.3)	55.9 (13.3)
Daily mean °F (°C)	17.1 (−8.3)	21.1 (−6.1)	32.5 (0.3)	45.0 (7.2)	57.4 (14.1)	66.8 (19.3)	70.8 (21.6)	68.8 (20.4)	60.9 (16.1)	48.5 (9.2)	35.3 (1.8)	23.3 (−4.8)	45.6 (7.6)
Mean daily minimum °F (°C)	8.0 (−13.3)	11.1 (−11.6)	22.4 (−5.3)	34.0 (1.1)	46.2 (7.9)	56.0 (13.3)	60.0 (15.6)	58.0 (14.4)	49.4 (9.7)	37.7 (3.2)	26.3 (−3.2)	15.1 (−9.4)	35.4 (1.9)
Mean minimum °F (°C)	−14.1 (−25.6)	−10.8 (−23.8)	0.5 (−17.5)	20.2 (−6.6)	31.1 (−0.5)	41.9 (5.5)	48.8 (9.3)	46.2 (7.9)	34.5 (1.4)	23.7 (−4.6)	9.9 (−12.3)	−6.2 (−21.2)	−18.2 (−27.9)
Record low °F (°C)	−45 (−43)	−42 (−41)	−30 (−34)	7 (−14)	22 (−6)	30 (−1)	37 (3)	27 (−3)	20 (−7)	2 (−17)	−13 (−25)	−34 (−37)	−45 (−43)
Average precipitation inches (mm)	1.36 (35)	1.28 (33)	1.91 (49)	3.71 (94)	4.44 (113)	4.97 (126)	4.36 (111)	4.14 (105)	3.49 (89)	2.85 (72)	2.10 (53)	1.66 (42)	36.27 (922)
Average snowfall inches (cm)	10.9 (28)	10.0 (25)	5.9 (15)	2.4 (6.1)	0.0 (0.0)	0.0 (0.0)	0.0 (0.0)	0.0 (0.0)	0.0 (0.0)	0.3 (0.76)	1.7 (4.3)	10.8 (27)	42.0 (107)
Average extreme snow depth inches (cm)	9.9 (25)	10.4 (26)	7.2 (18)	1.5 (3.8)	0.0 (0.0)	0.0 (0.0)	0.0 (0.0)	0.0 (0.0)	0.0 (0.0)	0.3 (0.76)	1.6 (4.1)	7.1 (18)	13.1 (33)
Average precipitation days (≥ 0.01 in)	7.4	7.1	7.8	10.5	12.0	11.1	9.1	9.4	9.2	9.5	7.8	8.0	108.9
Average snowy days (≥ 0.1 in)	5.6	5.2	2.7	1.1	0.0	0.0	0.0	0.0	0.0	0.2	1.1	5.1	21.0
Source 1: NOAA
Source 2: National Weather Service

== Demographics ==
Historical population
Census	Pop.	Note	%±
1880	394		—
1890	760		92.9%
1910	1,104		—
1920	1,112		0.7%
1930	1,245		12.0%
1940	1,138		−8.6%
1950	1,069		−6.1%
1960	1,021		−4.5%
1970	1,082		6.0%
1980	1,273		17.7%
1990	1,329		4.4%
2000	1,397		5.1%
2010	1,495		7.0%
2020	1,448		−3.1%
U.S. Decennial Census

=== 2010 census ===
As of the census of 2010, there were 1,495 people, 628 households, and 356 families residing in the city. The population density was 782.7 inhabitants per square mile (302.2/km^{2}). There were 823 housing units at an average density of 430.9 per square mile (166.4/km^{2}). The racial makeup of the city was 95.3% White, 1.7% African American, 0.9% Native American, 0.5% Asian, 0.4% from other races, and 1.2% from two or more races. Hispanic or Latino people of any race were 2.9% of the population.

There were 628 households, of which 27.1% had children under the age of 18 living with them, 39.8% were married couples living together, 11.1% had a female householder with no husband present, 5.7% had a male householder with no wife present, and 43.3% were non-families. 37.6% of all households were made up of individuals, and 21.6% had someone living alone who was 65 years of age or older. The average household size was 2.23 and the average family size was 2.89.

The median age in the city was 44.1 years. 21.2% of residents were under the age of 18; 7.9% were between the ages of 18 and 24; 22.1% were from 25 to 44; 25.9% were from 45 to 64; and 23% were 65 years of age or older. The gender makeup of the city was 49.6% male and 50.4% female.

=== 2000 census ===
As of the census of 2000, there were 1,397 people, 591 households, and 348 families residing in the city. The population density was 732.6 people per square mile (282.4/km^{2}). There were 677 housing units at an average density of 355.0 per square mile (136.9/km^{2}). The racial makeup of the city was 96.13% White, 0.29% Black or African American, 1.00% Native American, 0.43% Asian, 0.14% Pacific Islander, 1.15% from other races, and 0.86% from two or more races. 2.36% of the population were Hispanic or Latino of any race.

There were 591 households, out of which 27.9% had children under the age of 18 living with them, 47.5% were married couples living together, 8.0% had a female householder with no husband present, and 41.1% were non-families. 37.2% of all households were made up of individuals, and 20.1% had someone living alone who was 65 years of age or older. The average household size was 2.25 and the average family size was 2.96.

In the city, the population was spread out, with 23.7% under the age of 18, 7.5% from 18 to 24, 26.3% from 25 to 44, 20.2% from 45 to 64, and 22.3% who were 65 years of age or older. The median age was 40 years. For every 100 females, there were 95.7 males. For every 100 females age 18 and over, there were 95.6 males.

The median income for a household in the city was $32,500, and the median income for a family was $43,625. Males had a median income of $29,438 versus $21,375 for females. The per capita income for the city was $15,676. About 5.4% of families and 9.2% of the population were below the poverty line, including 8.6% of those under age 18 and 10.6% of those age 65 or over.

== Religion ==
St. John's Evangelical Lutheran Church is a member of the Wisconsin Evangelical Lutheran Synod (WELS) in Montello.

== Transportation ==
=== Roads ===
WIS 22 runs north to Wautoma and south to Pardeeville
WIS 23 runs east to Princeton and west to Wisconsin Dells and Oxford via WIS 82.

The west junction intersection of WIS 22 and WIS 23 is the location of the only traffic light in the county. Other highways that enter into Montello are County Highways C, F, K, and Y.

=== Rails ===
Montello was once the eastern terminus of a spur line of the Wisconsin Central Railroad built in 1882 to service the granite quarry and other industries. This line split from the WC's Stevens Point-Portage line (the "P" Line) at Packwaukee, and ran along the north shore of Buffalo Lake to Montello. The P-Line was abandoned in 1946 along with the Montello spur despite the fact that there was still almost daily service on it.

== Education ==
It is in the Montello School District.

== Notable people ==
- Bob Bruer, former National Football League player and coach
- K. J. Callahan, Wisconsin state legislator
- B. Frank Goodell, Wisconsin state legislator
- Charles S. Kelsey, Wisconsin state legislator
- Edwin B. Kelsey, lawyer, businessman, Wisconsin state legislator
- James F. McDowell, Wisconsin state legislator
- Spencer A. Pease, Wisconsin state legislator
- William A. Schmidt, Wisconsin state legislator

== Popular culture ==
- Underground Sunshine, a psychedelic rock band, is from Montello.
- A season 4 episode of the Discovery Channel series A Haunting, called "Legend Trippers", takes place in Montello and the nearby town of Green Lake.

== Gallery ==
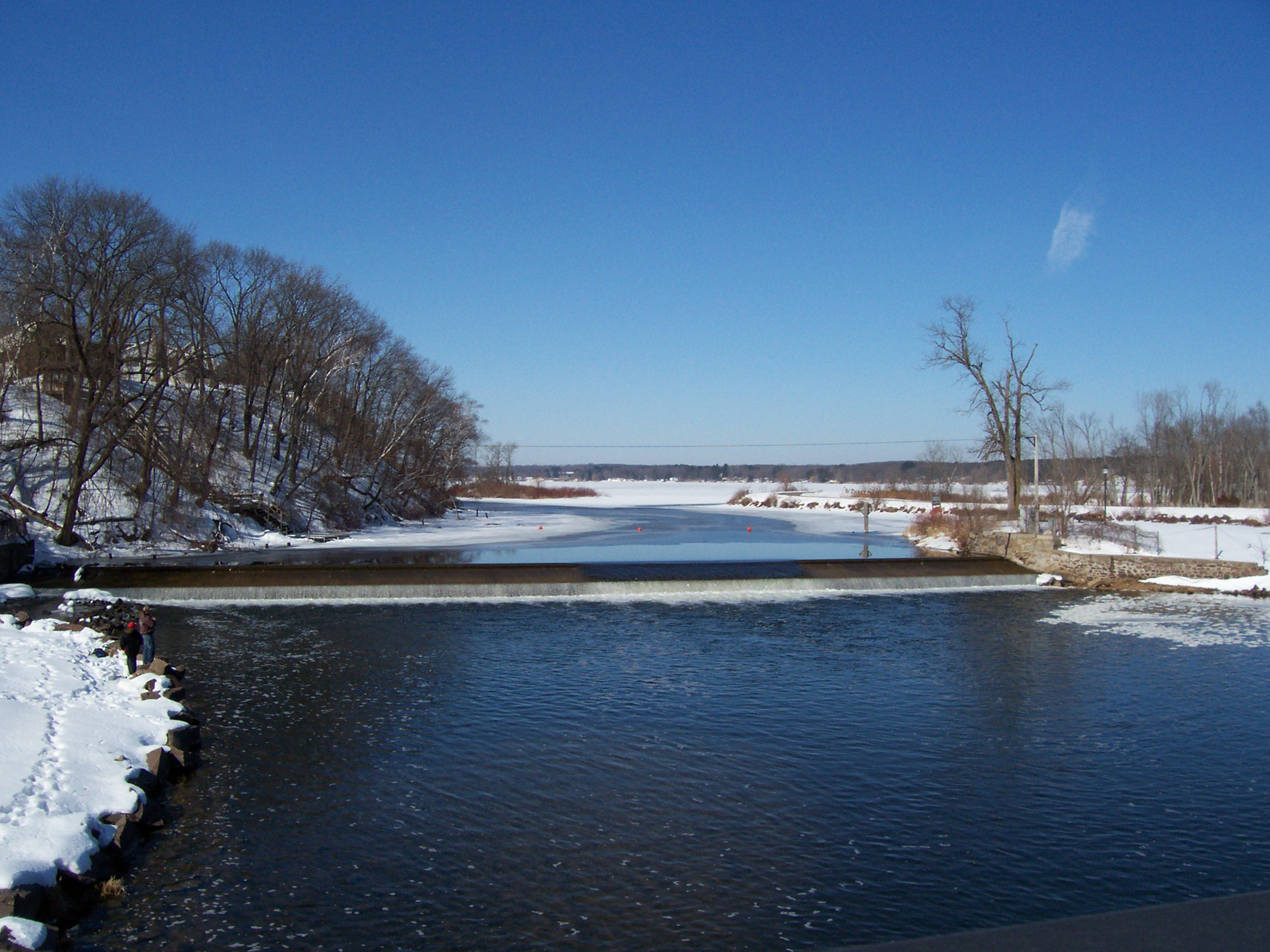
Looking west at the dam and Buffalo Lake

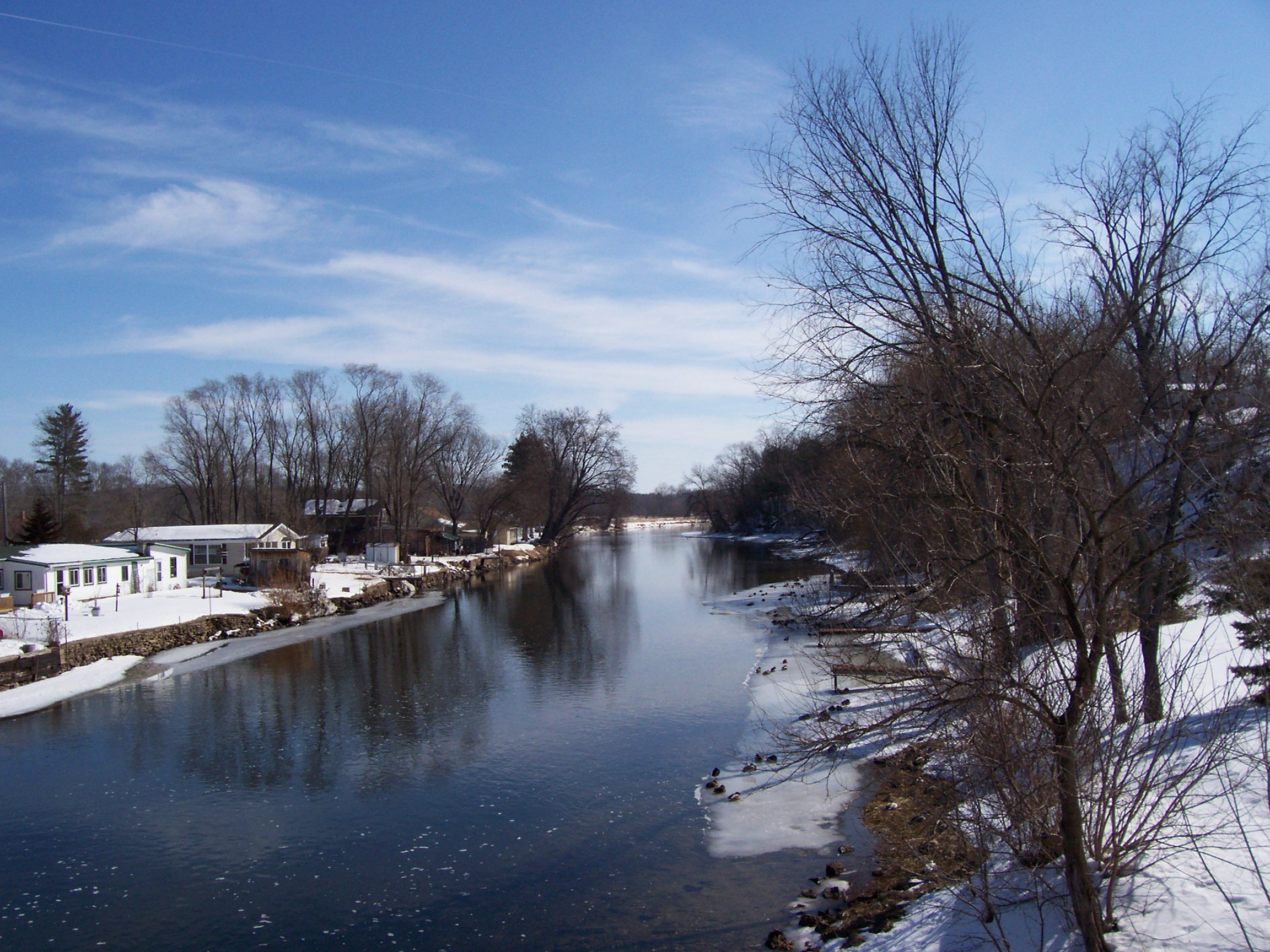
Houses built near the Upper Fox River west of the dam

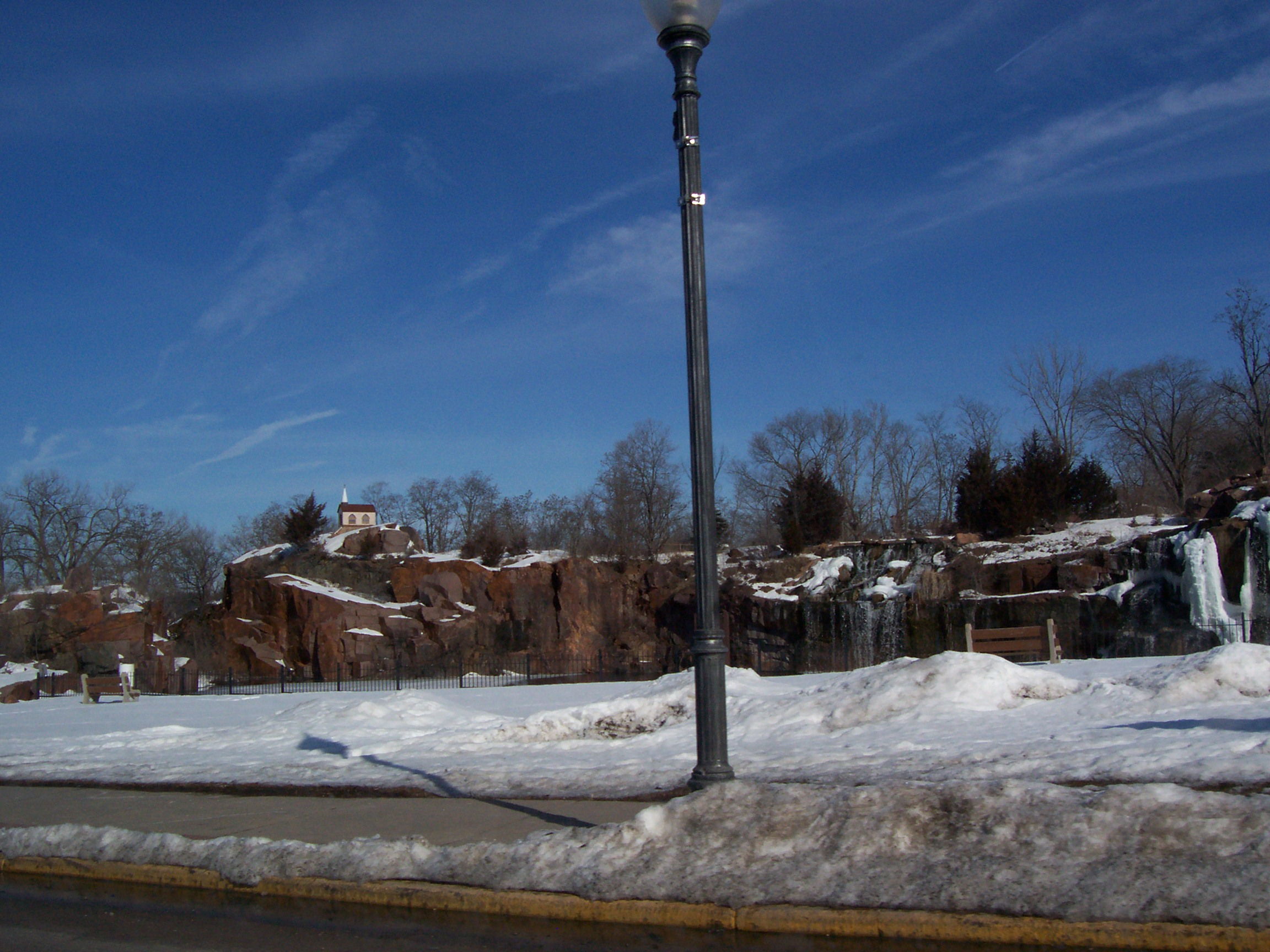
Quarry in Montello

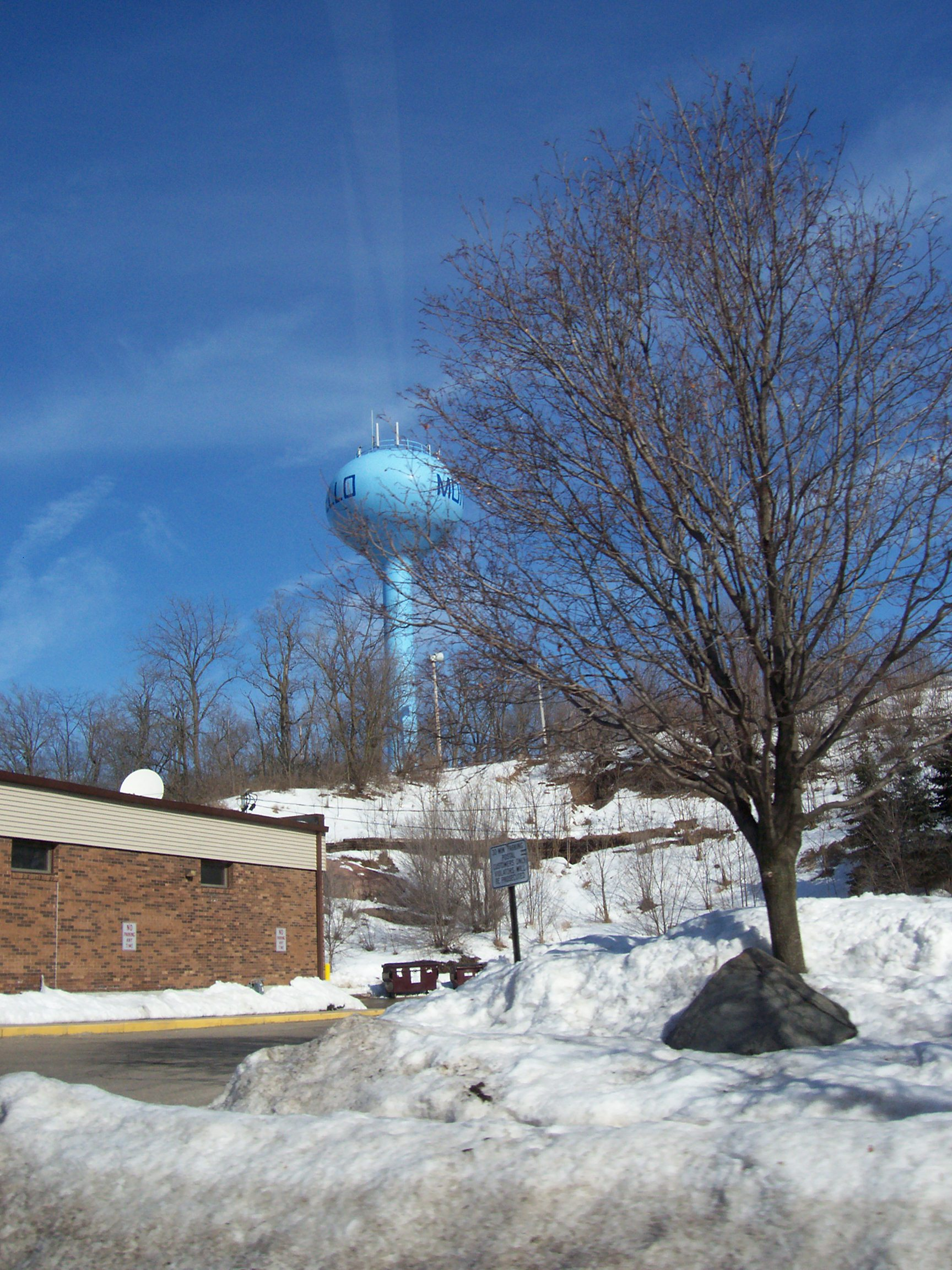
Water tower

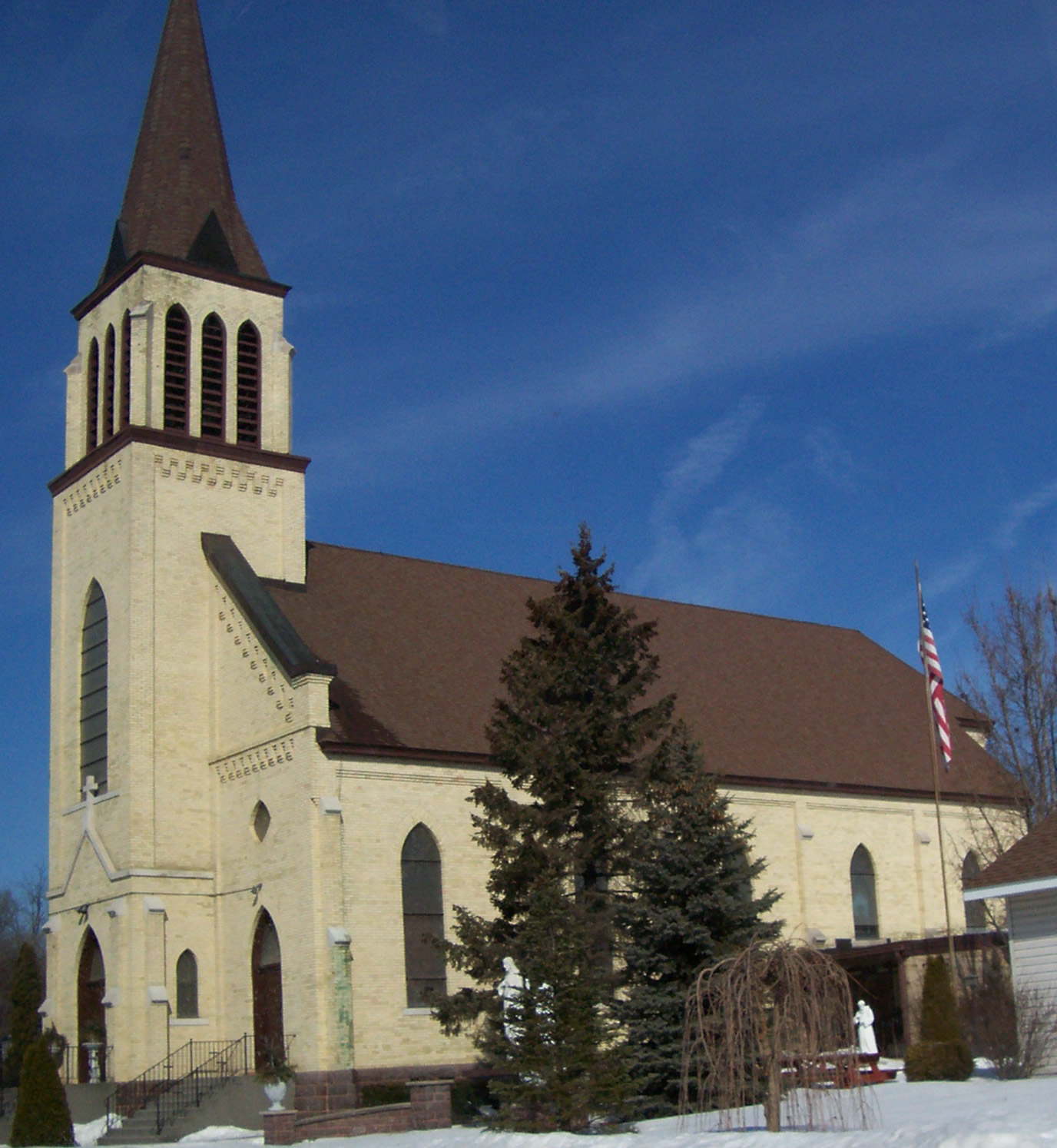
Catholic church

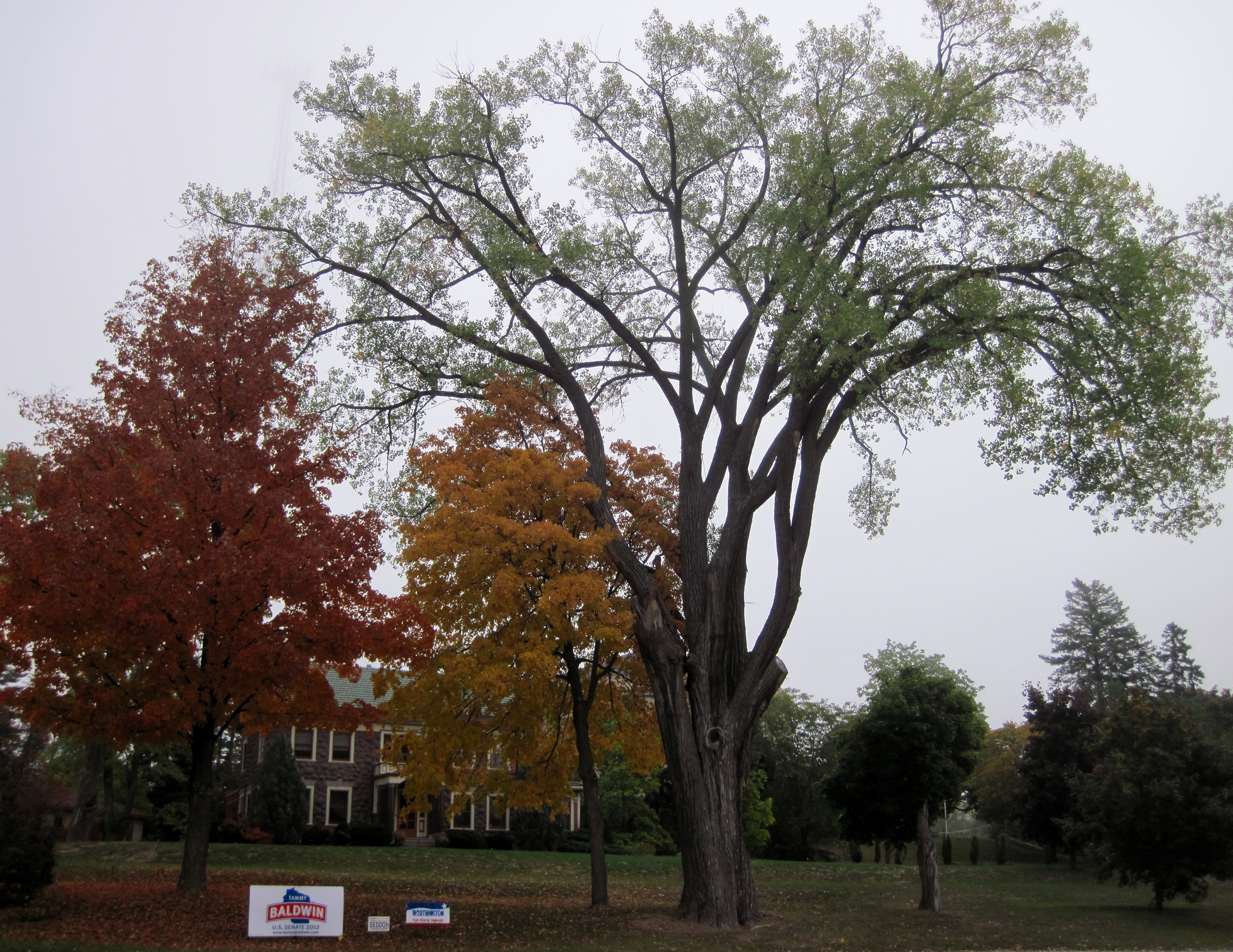
Wisconsin's tallest tree

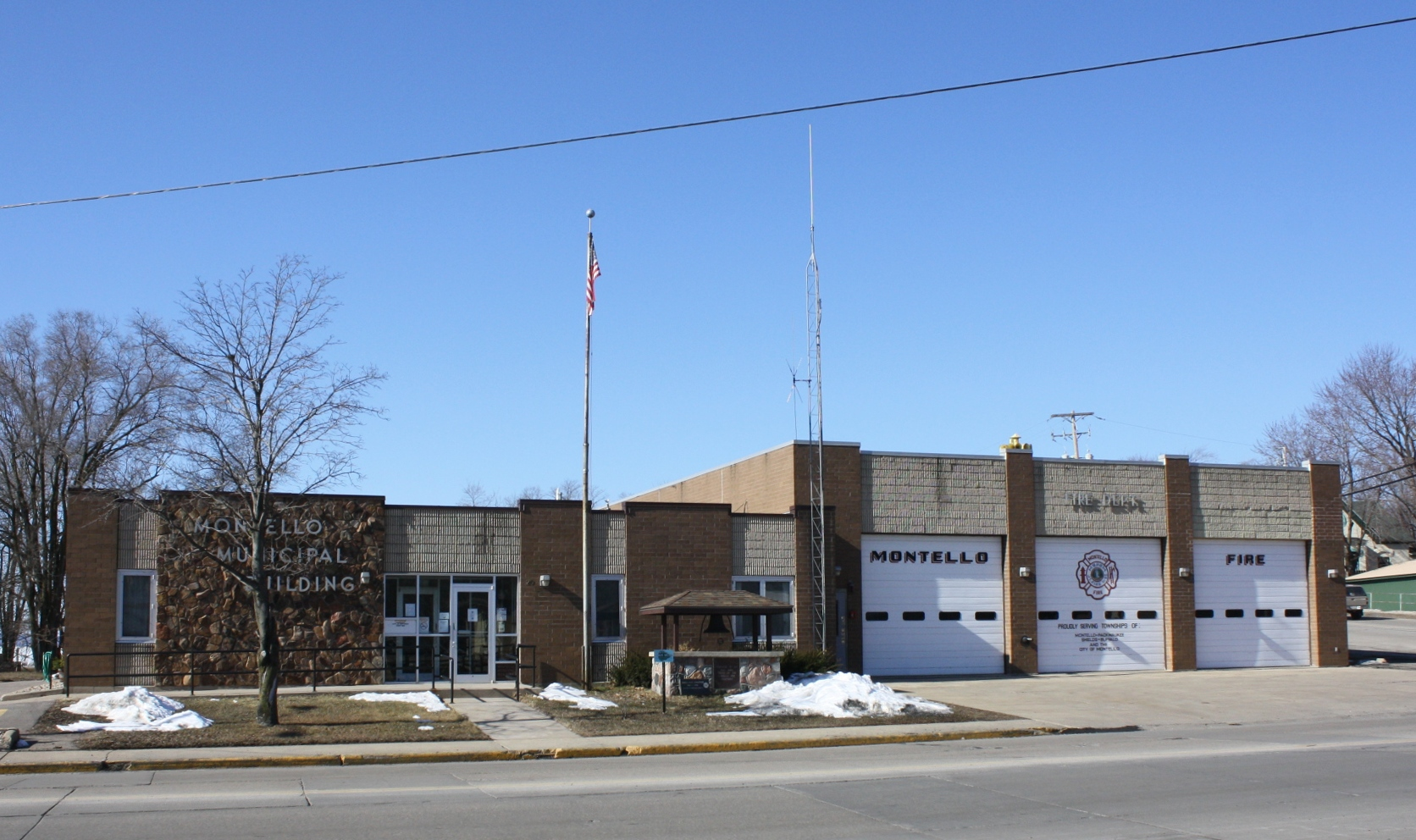
Municipal building and fire department

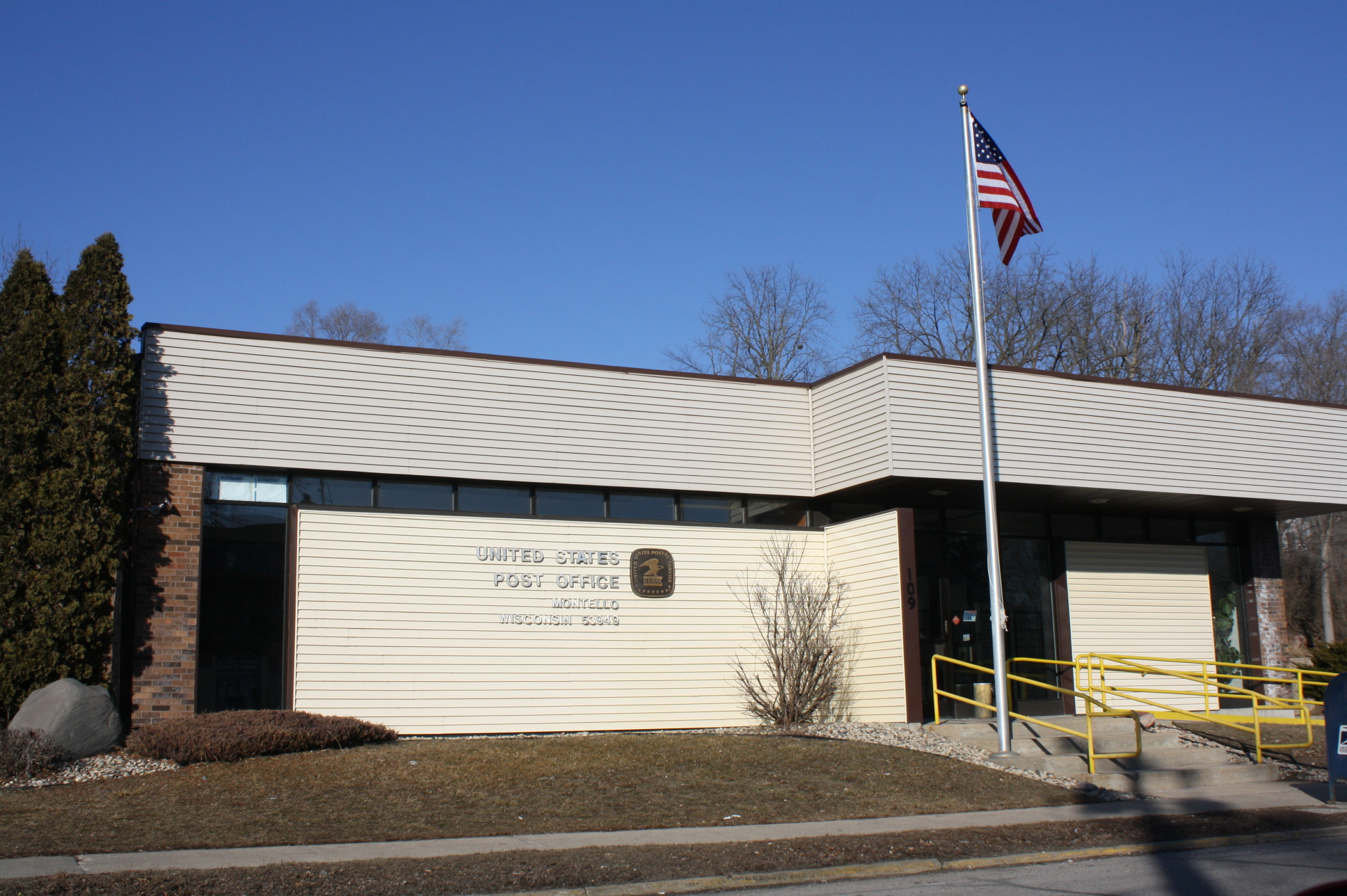
Post office

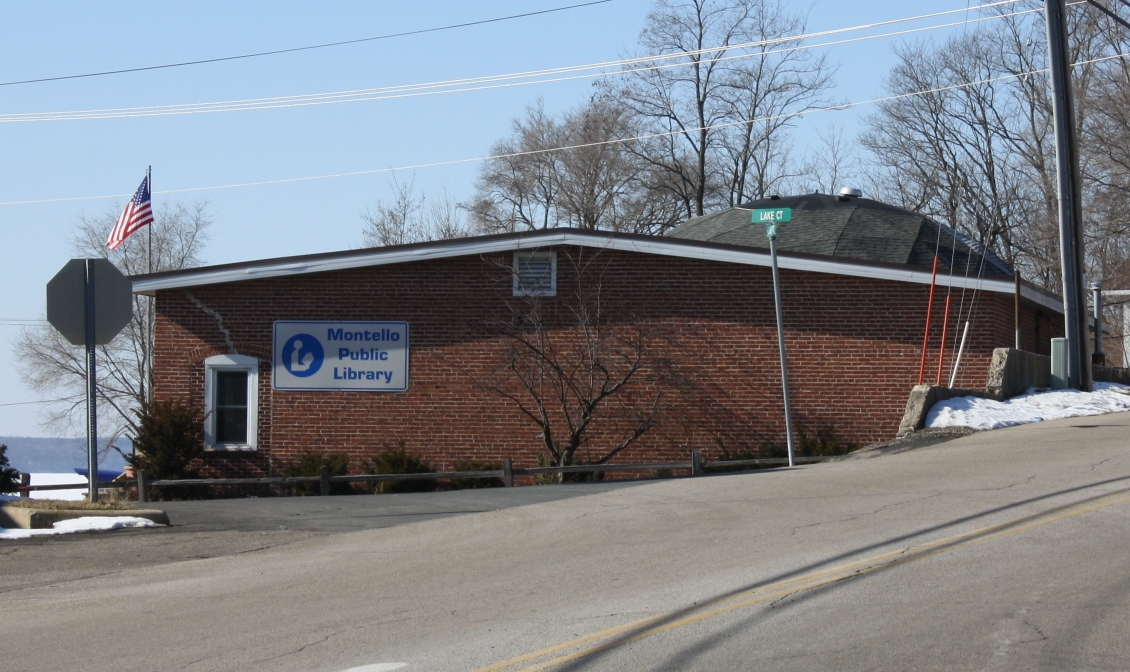
Library

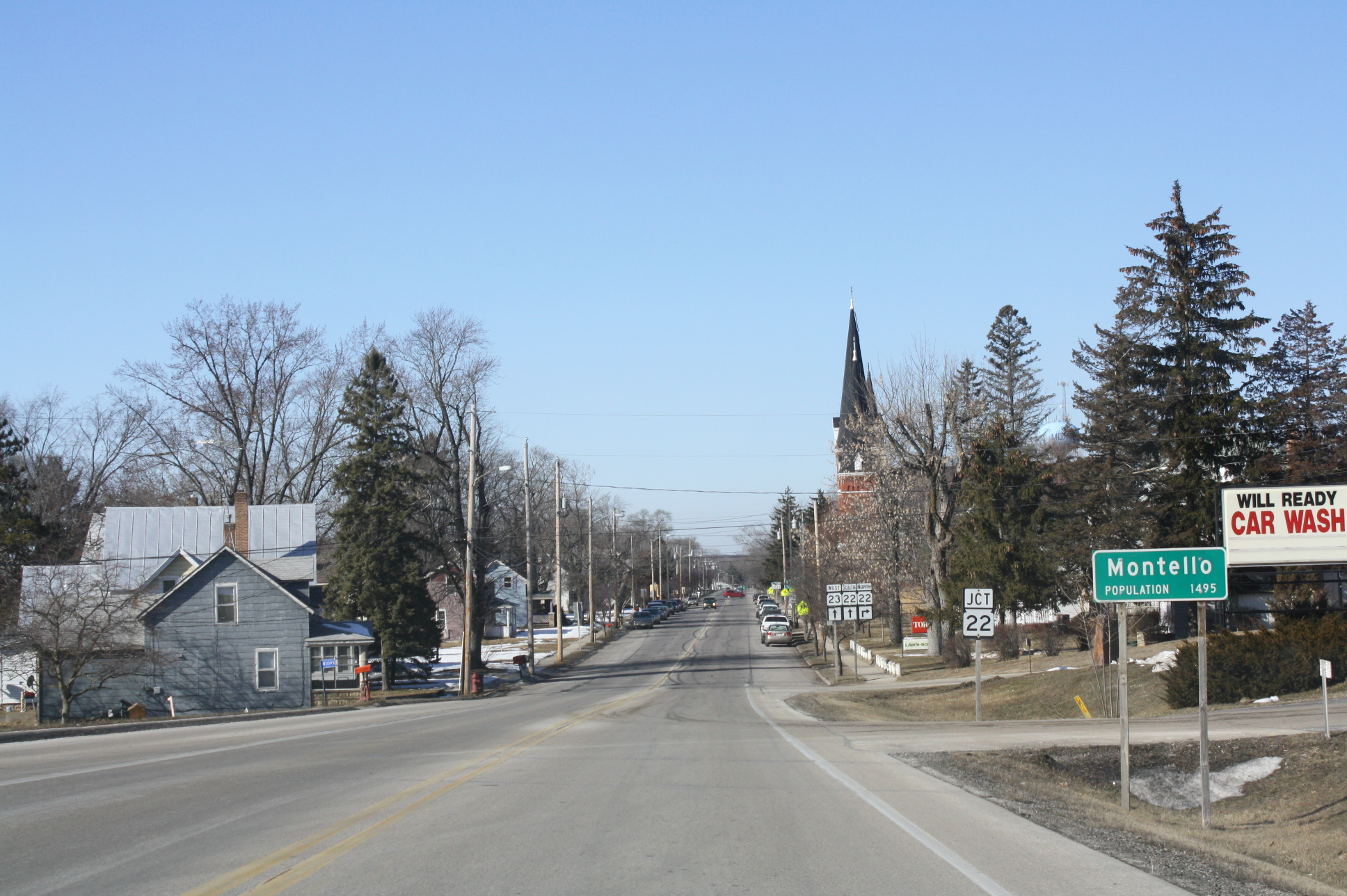
Sign on WIS 23

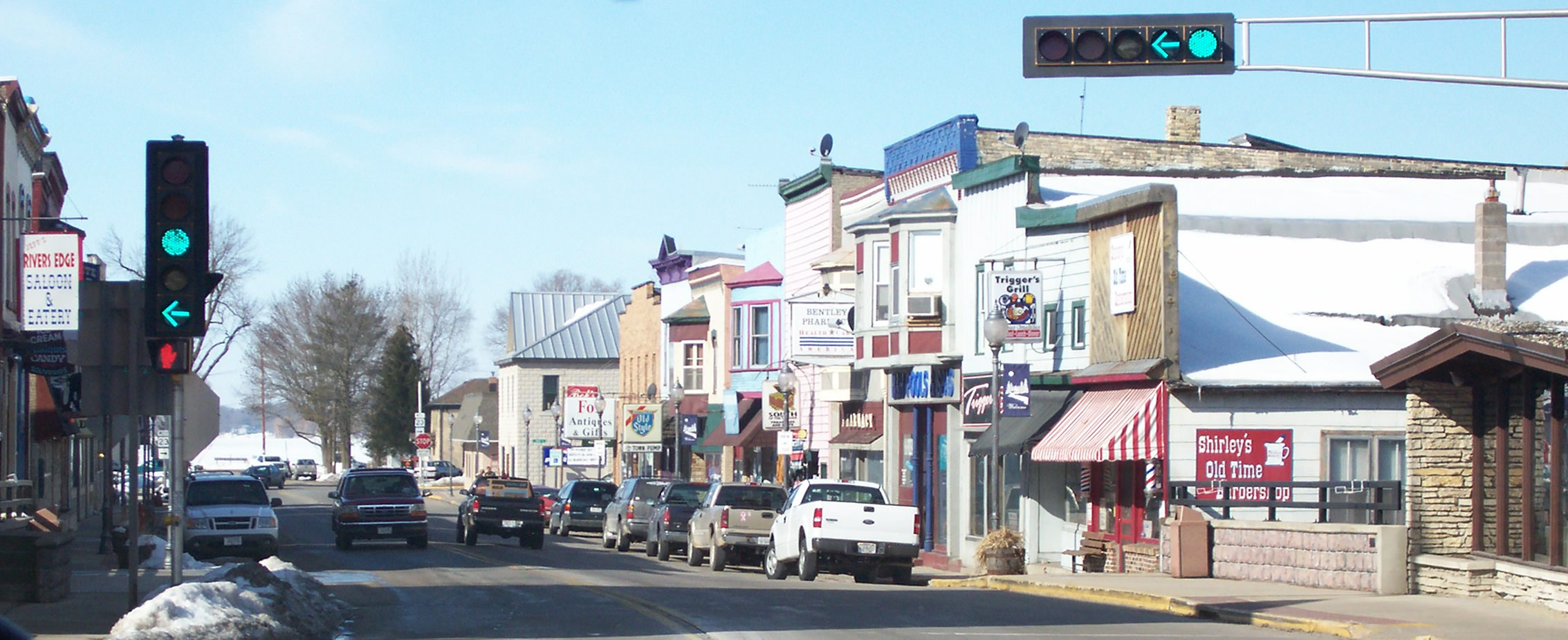
Looking west at downtown Montello

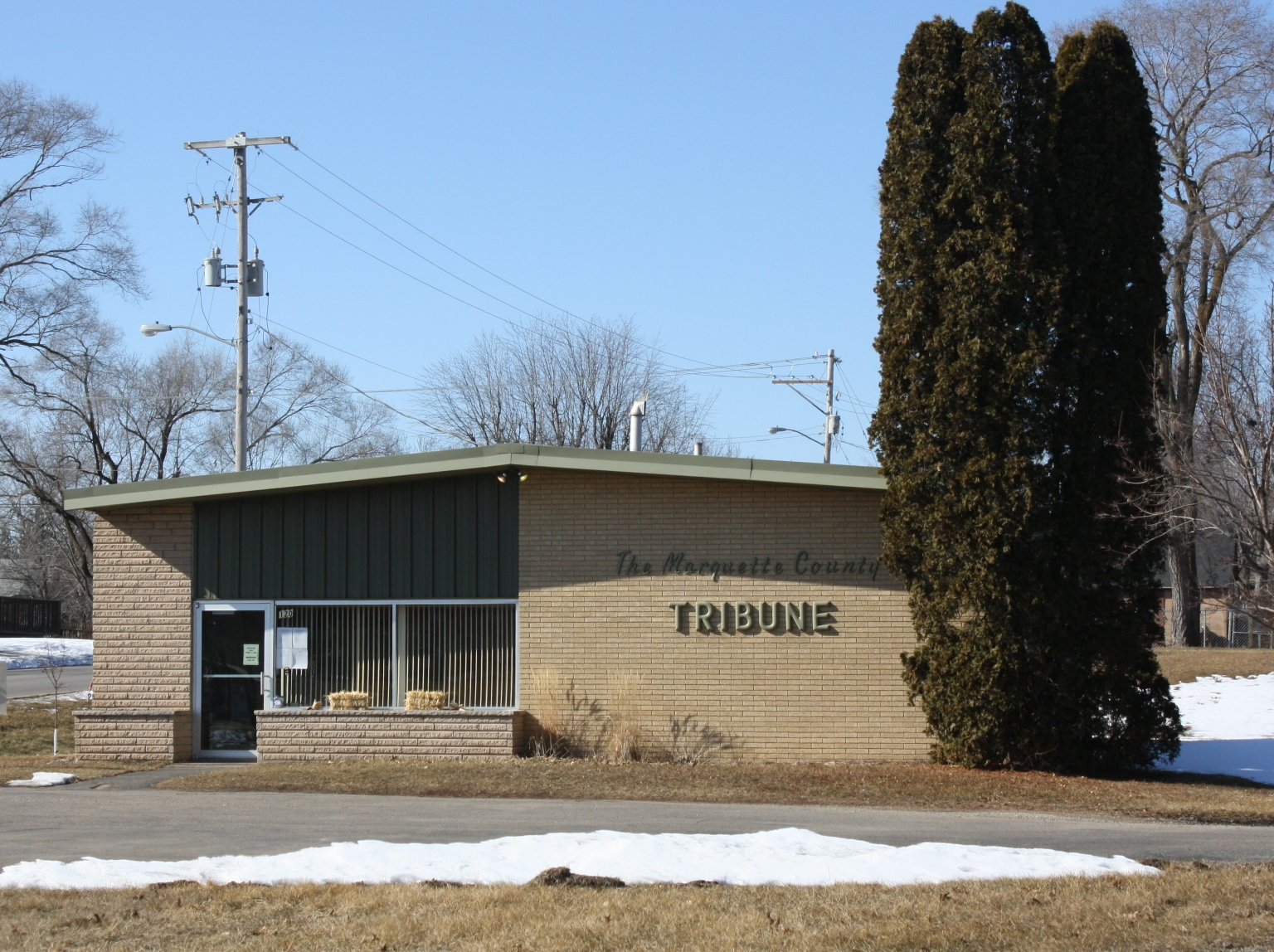
Marquette County Tribune building
