= Yahoo Movies =

American film website

Yahoo! Movies
- Website type: Movies
- Owner: Yahoo!
- Website: movies.yahoo.com
- Commercial: No
- Registration: Optional
- Launched: May 12, 1998; 28 years ago (as Upcoming Movies)
- Current status: Disconnected July 20, 2022

Yahoo! Movies (formerly Upcoming Movies), provided by the Yahoo! network, was home to a large collection of information on movies, past and new releases, trailers and clips, box office information, and showtimes and movie theater information. Yahoo! Movies also included red carpet photos, actor galleries, and production stills. Users could read critic's reviews, write and read other user reviews, get personalized movie recommendations, purchase movie tickets online, and create and view other user's lists of their favorite movies.

== Special coverage ==
Yahoo! Movies devoted special coverage to the Academy Awards with a special Oscars site. The Oscars site included articles, show coverage, a list of the night's big winners, photos, videos, and polls.

From 2002 to 2007, Yahoo! Movies was the home of Greg's Previews of Upcoming Movies, an enhanced version of Upcomingmovies.com, written by its creator, Greg Dean Schmitz.

Yahoo! Movies also released special guides, such as the Summer Movie Guide, which contained information on the major releases of the summer with exclusive trailers and clips, photos, box office information, polls, and unique editorial content.

Additionally, Yahoo! Movies teamed up with MTV to host a special site for the MTV Movie Awards, which featured show information and a section where users could submit original movie shorts parodying last year's movies for the chance to win the new award, Best Movie Spoof.

== Timeline ==
- May 12, 1998 – Yahoo! announces the launch of Yahoo! Movies.
- May 25, 2005 – Yahoo! Movies releases personalized movie recommendations.
- July 4, 2022 – Yahoo! announces the shutdown of Yahoo! Movies.
