= Westfield, Wisconsin =

Westfield
- Village
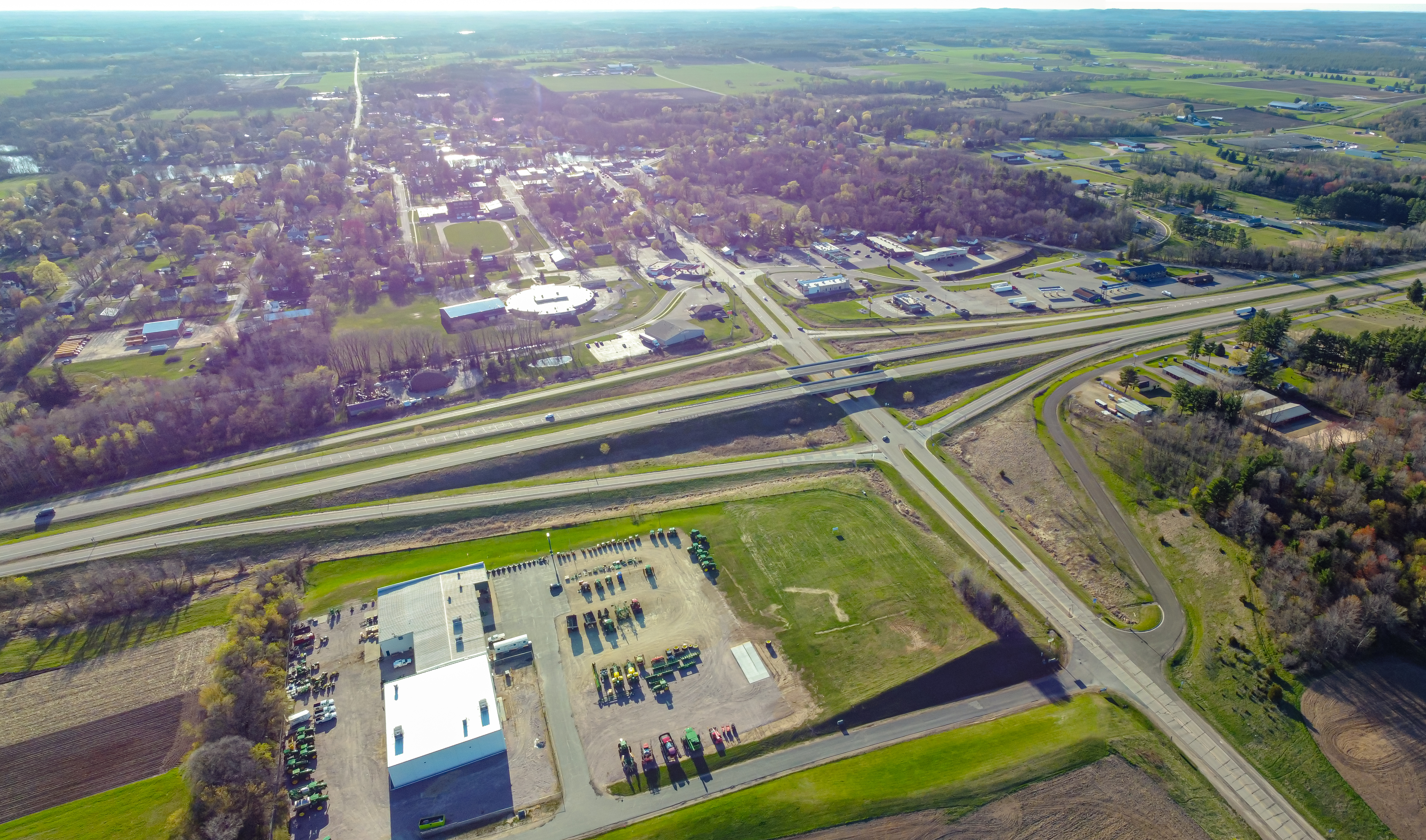
- Interstate-39 runs through town.

- Location of Westfield in Marquette County, Wisconsin

- Location within the state of Wisconsin
- Coordinates: 43°53′7″N 89°29′23″W
- Country: United States
- State: Wisconsin
- County: Marquette
- settled: 1848

Area
  - Total: 1.61 sq mi (4.17 km^{2})
  - Land: 1.58 sq mi (4.09 km^{2})
  - Water: 0.031 sq mi (0.08 km^{2})

Population (2020)
  - Total: 1,302
  - Density: 824/sq mi (318/km^{2})
- Time zone: UTC-6 (Central (CST))
  - Summer (DST): UTC-5 (CDT)
- Area code: 608
- FIPS code: 55-85575
- Website: www.villageofwestfieldwi.com

Westfield is a village in Marquette County, Wisconsin, United States. The population was 1,302 at the 2020 census. The village is located mostly within the Town of Westfield. A small portion extends east into the adjacent Town of Harris. The Marquette County fairgrounds is located within the village limits on the south side.

== History ==
The village was originally settled and laid out by Hungarian-American immigrant Agoston Haraszthy. It was first named "Széptáj"—Hungarian for "beautiful landscape"—and was later renamed "Haraszthy", in honor of the village founder. In 1849, the Legislature renamed the village "Westfield".

== Geography ==
According to the United States Census Bureau, the village has a total area of 1.59 square miles (4.12 km^{2}), of which 1.56 square miles (4.04 km^{2}) is land and 0.03 square miles (0.08 km^{2}) is water.

== Demographics ==
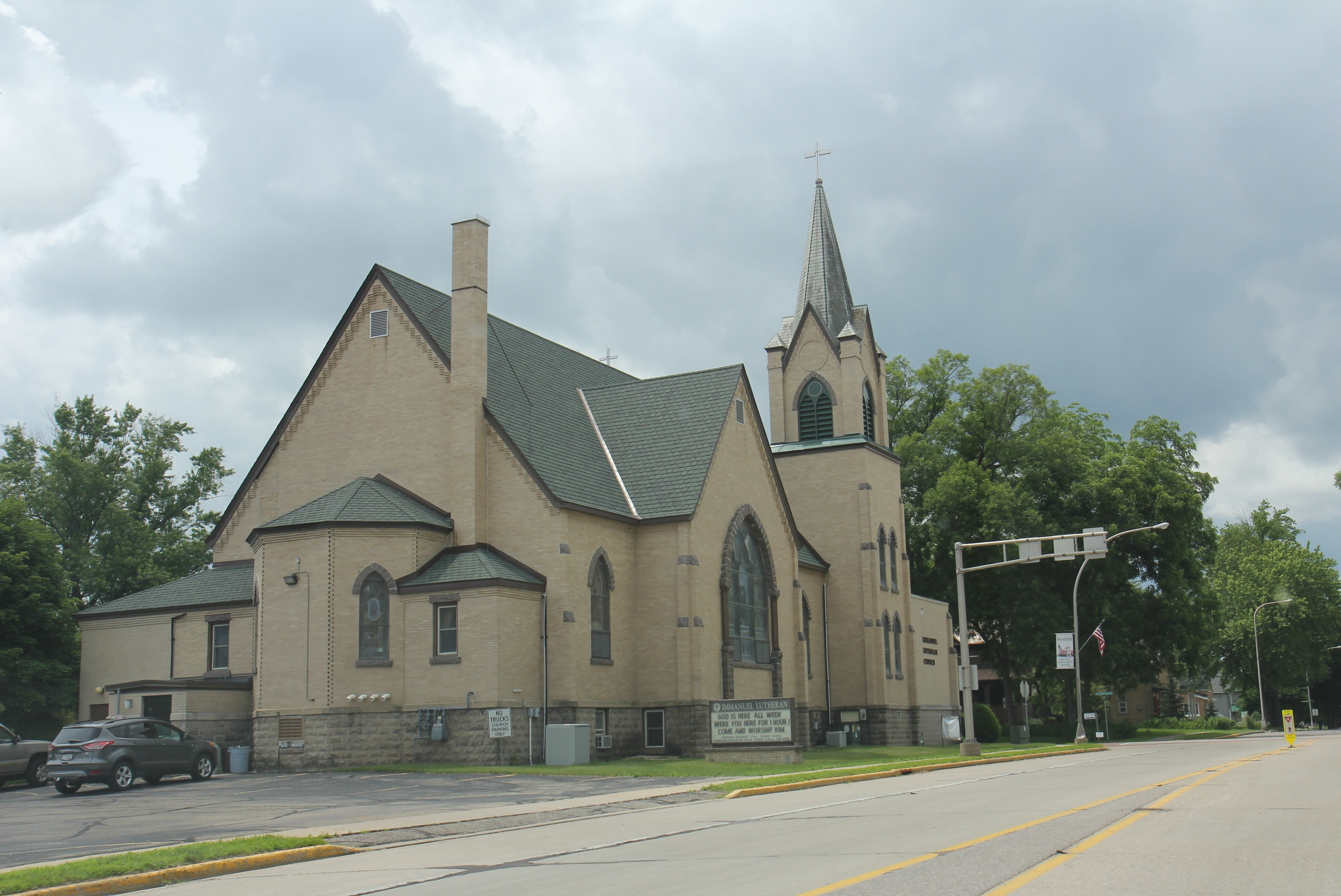
Emmanuel Lutheran Church

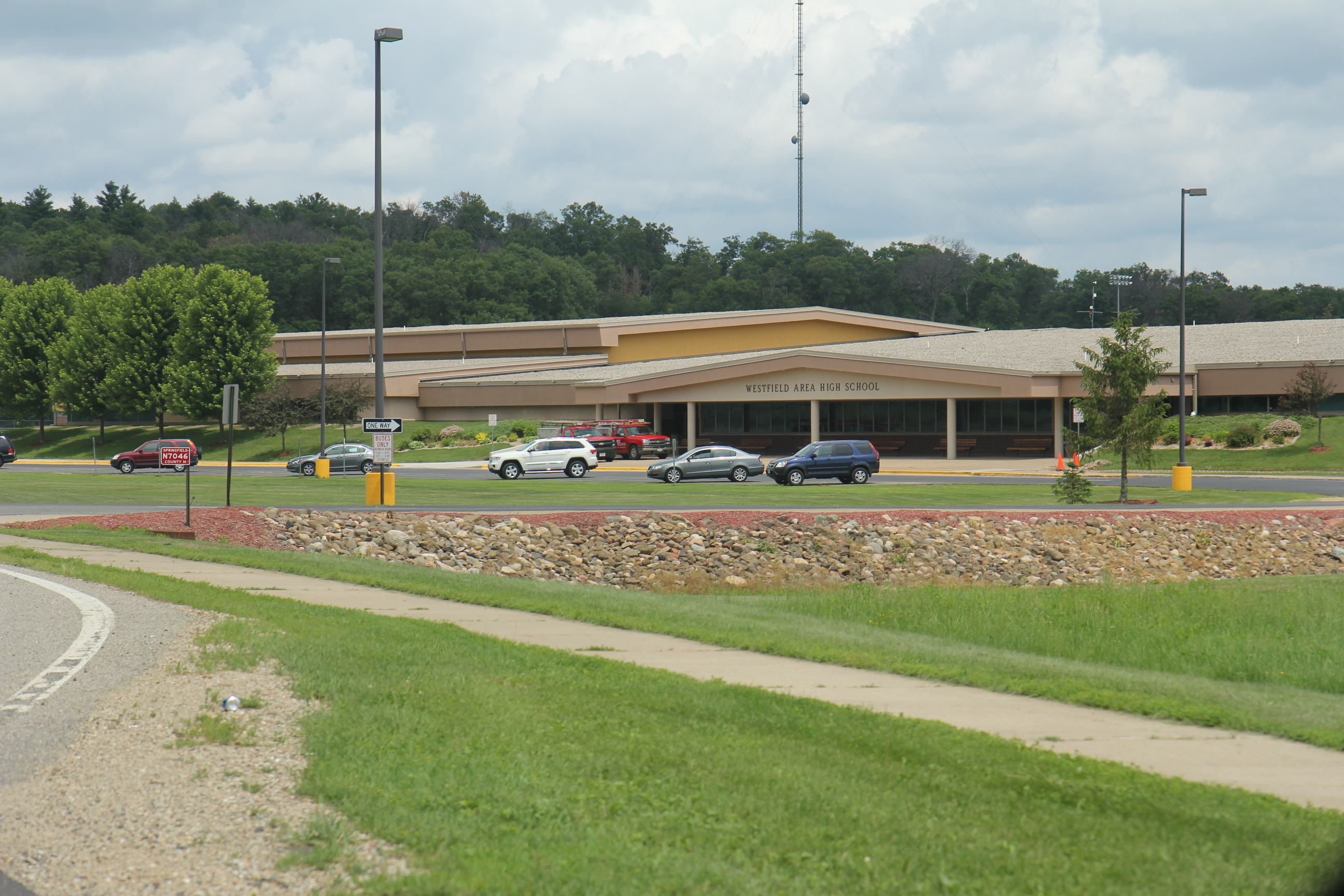
Westfield Area High School

Historical population
Census	Pop.	Note	%±
1880	283		—
1890	500		76.7%
1910	729		—
1920	858		17.7%
1930	769		−10.4%
1940	851		10.7%
1950	935		9.9%
1960	919		−1.7%
1970	884		−3.8%
1980	1,033		16.9%
1990	1,125		8.9%
2000	1,217		8.2%
2010	1,254		3.0%
2020	1,302		3.8%
U.S. Decennial Census

=== 2010 census ===
As of the census of 2010, there were 1,254 people, 523 households, and 321 families living in the village. The population density was 803.8 inhabitants per square mile (310.3/km^{2}). There were 578 housing units at an average density of 370.5 per square mile (143.1/km^{2}). The racial makeup of the village was 96.4% White, 0.3% African American, 0.4% Native American, 0.8% Asian, 0.9% from other races, and 1.2% from two or more races. Hispanic or Latino people of any race were 3.7% of the population.

There were 523 households, of which 34.0% had children under the age of 18 living with them, 42.4% were married couples living together, 12.8% had a female householder with no husband present, 6.1% had a male householder with no wife present, and 38.6% were non-families. 32.7% of all households were made up of individuals, and 17.7% had someone living alone who was 65 years of age or older. The average household size was 2.40 and the average family size was 3.03.

The median age in the village was 36.8 years. 27.4% of residents were under the age of 18; 8.9% were between the ages of 18 and 24; 24.2% were from 25 to 44; 23.8% were from 45 to 64; and 15.7% were 65 years of age or older. The gender makeup of the village was 48.2% male and 51.8% female.

=== 2000 census ===
As of the census of 2000, there were 1,217 people, 504 households, and 325 families living in the village. The population density was 859.1 people per square mile (330.9/km^{2}). There were 553 housing units at an average density of 390.4 per square mile (150.4/km^{2}). The racial makeup of the village was 97.45% White, 0.16% Black or African American, 0.41% Native American, 0.25% Asian, 0.08% from other races, and 1.64% from two or more races. 3.53% of the population were Hispanic or Latino of any race.

There were 504 households, out of which 34.5% had children under the age of 18 living with them, 46.6% were married couples living together, 13.3% had a female householder with no husband present, and 35.5% were non-families. 32.1% of all households were made up of individuals, and 18.3% had someone living alone who was 65 years of age or older. The average household size was 2.38 and the average family size was 2.96.

In the village, the population was spread out, with 27.7% under the age of 18, 8.8% from 18 to 24, 26.7% from 25 to 44, 20.0% from 45 to 64, and 16.8% who were 65 years of age or older. The median age was 36 years. For every 100 females, there were 94.1 males. For every 100 females age 18 and over, there were 83.0 males.

The median income for a household in the village was $30,341, and the median income for a family was $34,306. Males had a median income of $30,758 versus $22,938 for females. The per capita income for the village was $17,318. About 7.3% of families and 9.5% of the population were below the poverty line, including 10.2% of those under age 18 and 15.3% of those age 65 or over.

== Education ==
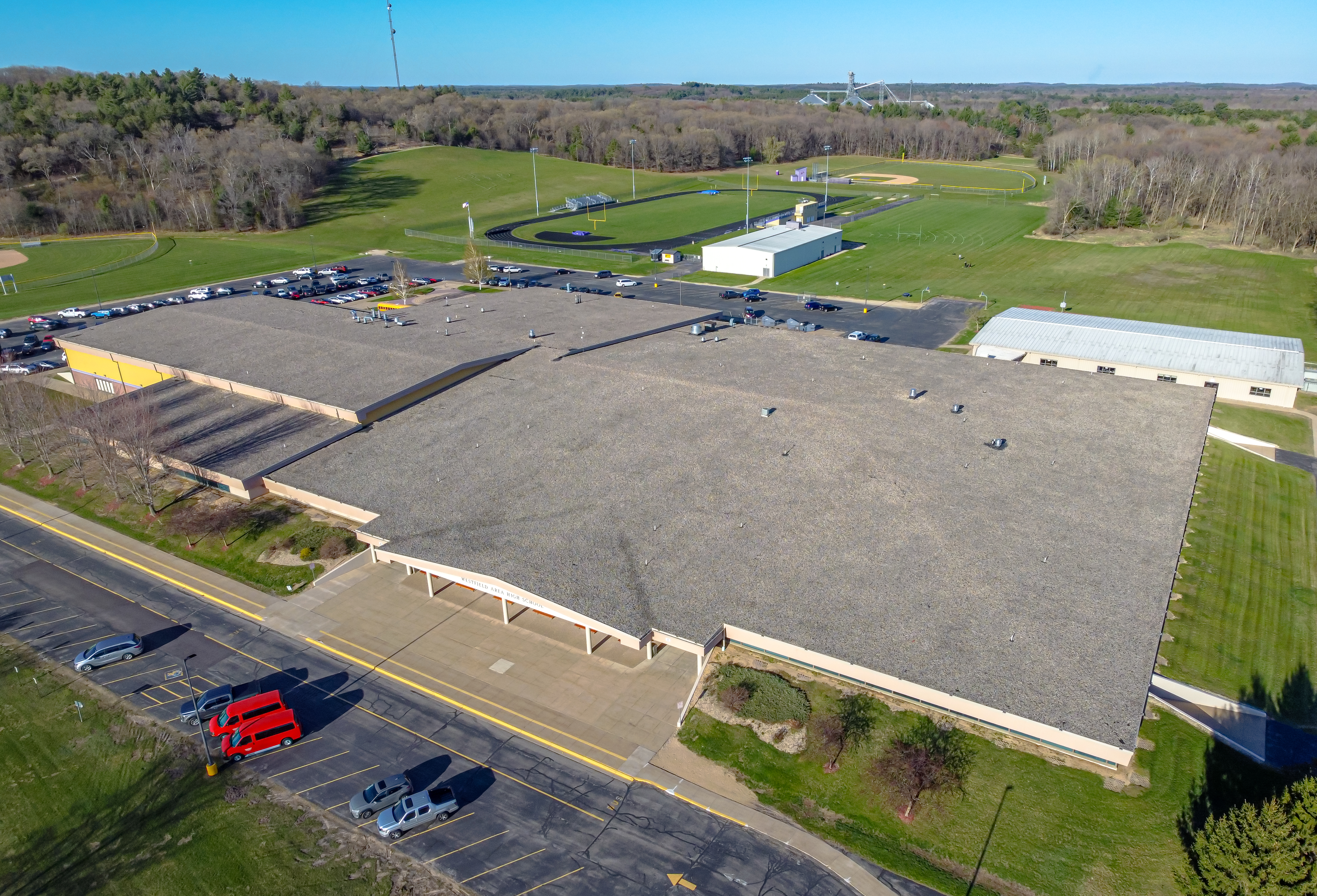
Westfield Area High School

Westfield is part of the School District of Westfield. There are three elementary schools, one middle school, and one high school in the district.

== Notable people ==
- Robert M. Long, Wisconsin State Representative
- Levi E. Pond, Wisconsin State Senator
- Greg Dean Schmitz, film journalist (Yahoo! Movies, Rotten Tomatoes)
