= Spencer A. Pease =

American politician

Spencer Adams Pease (February 24, 1817 – December 19, 1889) was an American medical doctor, newspaper editor, lawyer, and politician.

Born in Spafford, Onondaga County, New York, Pease was educated in Auburn, New York. In 1837, Pease settled in Salem, Wisconsin Territory and practiced law. Pease then studied medicine at Rush Medical College and practiced medicine. In 1850, Pease settled in Packwaukee, Marquette County, Wisconsin. In 1862, Pease moved to Montello, Wisconsin. He became the editor and publisher that eventually became the Montello Weekly Express. Pease also served as Marquette County treasurer in 1857 and 1858 In 1865, 1866, 1870, and 1871, Pease served in the Wisconsin State Assembly and was a Democrat. Pease died in Montello, Wisconsin.
