= Neil Dimond =

American politician

Neil Dimond was an Irish-born American politician. He was a member of the Wisconsin State Assembly during the 1872 session. Other positions he held include Sheriff of Marquette County, Wisconsin. He was a Democrat. Dimond was born on November 20, 1832, in what was then County Londonderry, Ireland.
