= Westfield, Marquette County, Wisconsin =

Westfield, Wisconsin
- Town
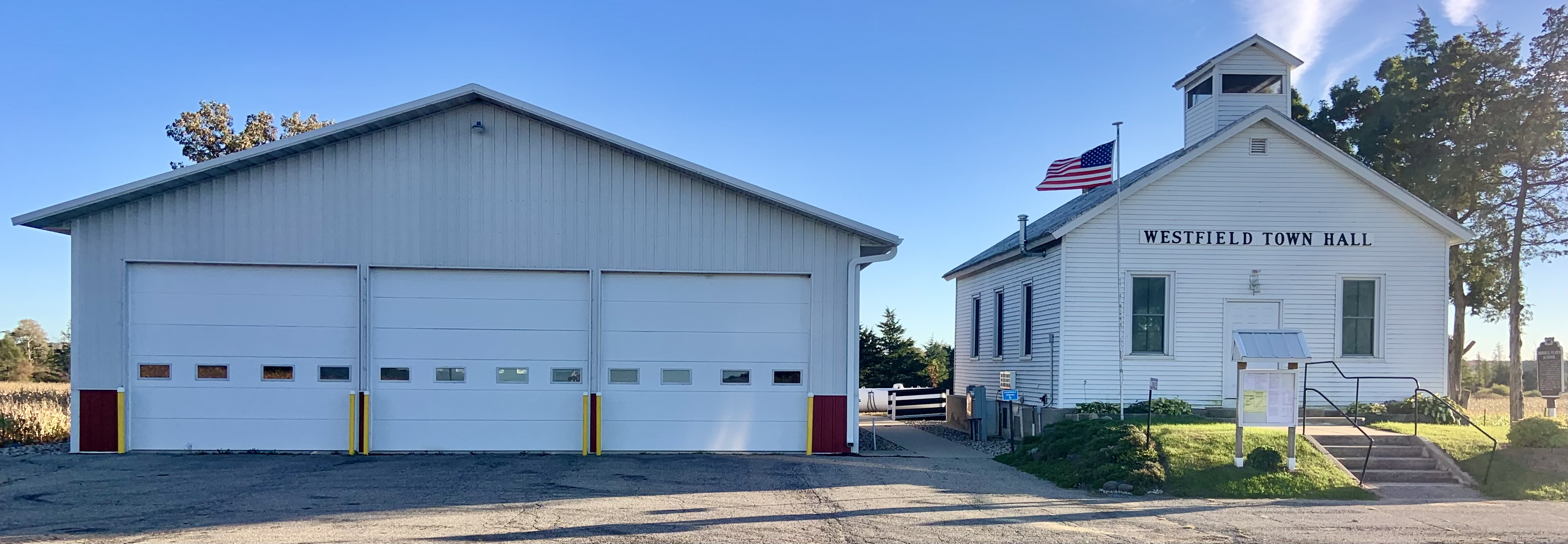
- Town hall

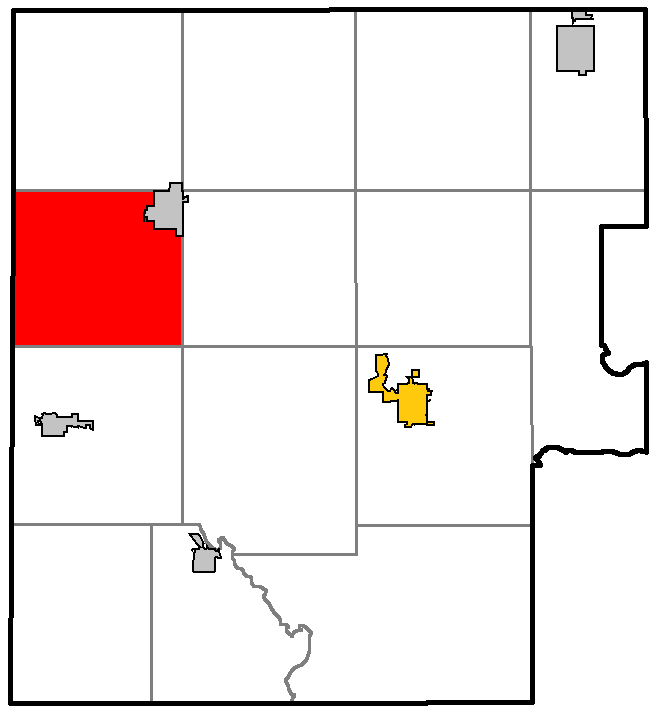
- Location of Westfield (town), Marquette County, Wisconsin

- Location of Marquette County, Wisconsin
- Coordinates: 43°51′17″N 89°32′33″W
- Country: United States
- State: Wisconsin
- County: Marquette

Area
  - Total: 28.9 sq mi (74.8 km^{2})
  - Land: 28.3 sq mi (73.4 km^{2})
  - Water: 0.54 sq mi (1.4 km^{2})
- Elevation: 909 ft (277 m)

Population (2020)
  - Total: 789
  - Density: 27.8/sq mi (10.7/km^{2})
- Time zone: UTC-6 (Central (CST))
  - Summer (DST): UTC-5 (CDT)
- Area code: 608
- FIPS code: 55-85600
- GNIS feature ID: 1584404
- Website: https://townofwestfieldwisconsin.com/

There is also the Town of Westfield in Sauk County.

Westfield is a town located in Marquette County, Wisconsin, United States. As of the 2020 census, the town had a total population of 789. The Village of Westfield is located mostly within the town. The unincorporated community of Lawrence is also located in the town.

== Geography ==
According to the United States Census Bureau, the town has a total area of 28.986 square miles (75,074.392 km^{2}), of which 28.463 square miles (73,719.415 km^{2}) is land and 0.523 square miles (1,354.977 km^{2}) is water. The total area is 1.80484578549767% water.

== Demographics ==
As of the census of 2000, there were 689 people, 279 households, and 210 families residing in the town. The population density was 24.3 inhabitants per square mile (9.4/km^{2}). However, the current population signs read 1125 for the Township/Village of Westfield. There were 414 housing units at an average density of 5.6 persons/km^{2} (14.6 persons/sq mi). The racial makeup of the town was 98.98% White, 0.15% African American, 0.00% Native American, 0.73% Asian, 0.15% Pacific Islander, 0.00% from other races, and 0.00% from two or more races. 0.73% of the population were Hispanic or Latino of any race.

There were 279 households, out of which 26.5% had children under the age of 18 living with them, 67.4% were married couples living together, 4.7% had a woman whose husband does not live with her, and 24.7% were non-families. 20.1% of all households were made up of individuals, and 9.0% had someone living alone who was 65 years of age or older. The average household size was 2.46 and the average family size was 2.74.

In the town, the population was spread out, with 21.6% under the age of 18, 4.4% from 18 to 24, 27.3% from 25 to 44, 25.7% from 45 to 64, and 21.0% who were 65 years of age or older. The median age was 43 years. For every 100 females, there were 98.6 males. For every 100 females age 18 and over, there were 100.7 males.

The median income for a household in the town was $40,000, and the median income for a family was $46,875. Males had a median income of $35,781 versus $27,188 for females. The per capita income for the town was $20,887. 3.7% of the population and 1.0% of families were below the poverty line. Out of the total people living in poverty, 0.0% were under the age of 18 and 14.2% were 65 or older.

== Education ==
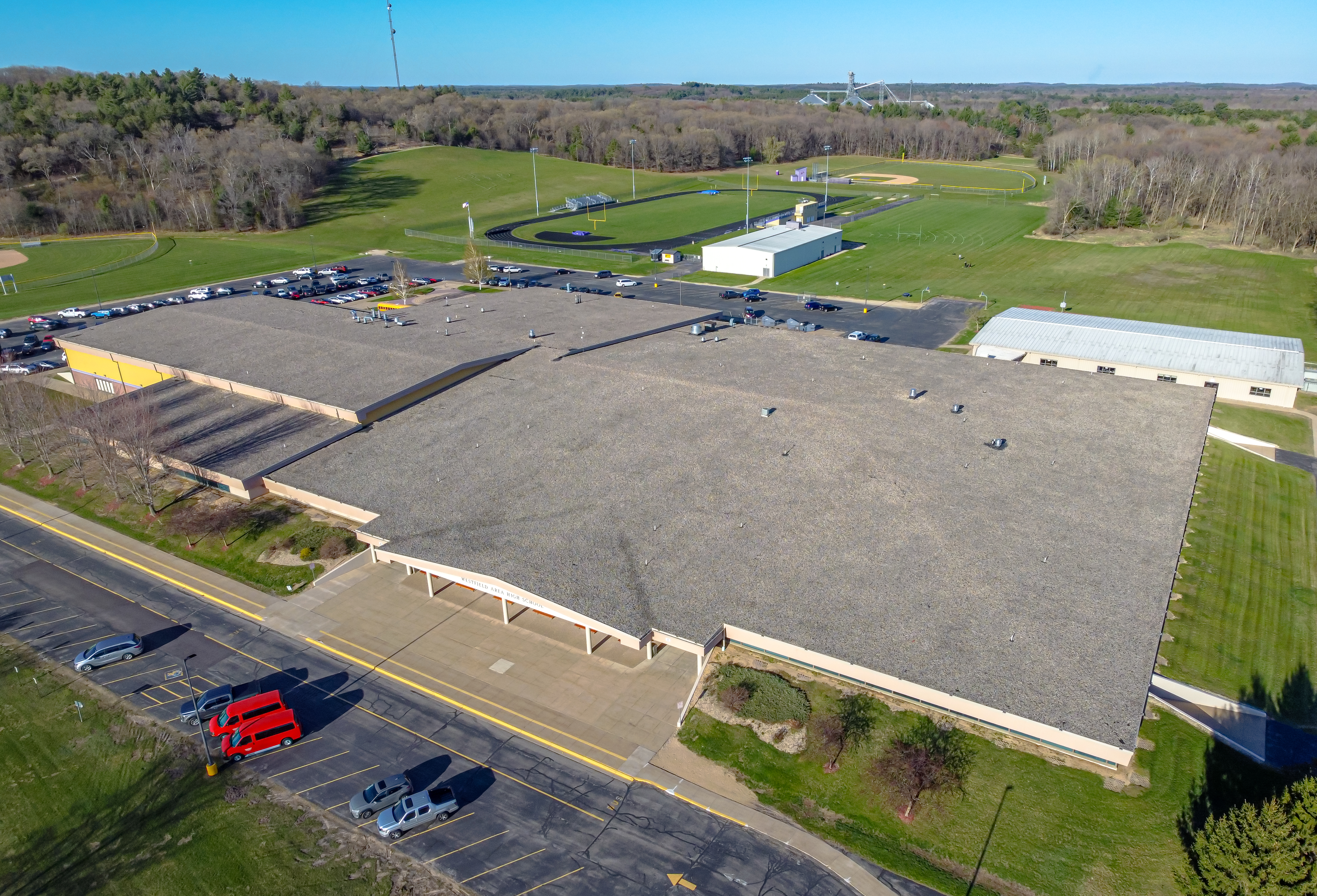
Westfield Area High School

It is part of the Westfield School District.

There is one elementary, one middle, and one high school in Westfield. Westfield Area High School serves students from the Oxford, Coloma, and Neshkoro areas. The school's mascot is the Pioneer.
