= B. Frank Goodell =

American publisher

Benjamin Franklin "Dad" Goodell (July 12, 1843 – December 10, 1924) was a member of the Wisconsin State Assembly.

== Biography ==
Goodell was born on July 12, 1843, in Monroe Township, Ashtabula County, Ohio. After his father died, he and his mother relocated to Montello, Wisconsin, around 1850. He was an editor and publisher by trade, and he founded the Montello Express with William Cogan. He married Mary Waldref (1847–1913) in 1865, and they relocated to Portage, Wisconsin, in 1878, where he worked for the Portage City Record. In 1886 he cofounded The Portage Daily Register with Sheppard S. Rockwood (1838–1905). He died of pneumonia at his daughter's home in Phoenix, Arizona, on December 10, 1924.

== Assembly career ==
Goodell was a member of the Assembly during the 1876 session. He was a Democrat.
