= William Murphy (Wisconsin legislator) =

American politician

William Murphy was an American merchant from Briggsville, Wisconsin who served two one-year terms (1869 and 1874) as a Democratic member of the Wisconsin State Assembly from Marquette County, Wisconsin.
