= William H. Peters =

American politician

William H. Peters was a Wisconsin lawyer who served as a Democratic member of the Wisconsin State Assembly.

== Biography ==
Peters was born on November 26, 1825, in Summerhill, New York. He became a lawyer.

== Political career ==
Peters was a member of the Assembly during the 1878 session. Other positions he held include District Attorney of Marquette County, Wisconsin.
