= Eugene V. Debs Award =

Annual award for unionism, social justice or peace

- Type: Labor award
- Awarded for: Industrial unionism, social justice, & world peace
- Description: Named in honor of Eugene V. Debs
- Presented by: Eugene V. Debs Foundation
- Established: 1965; 61 years ago
- Website: Award page

The Eugene V. Debs Award is an award accorded by the Eugene V. Debs Foundation, in Terre Haute, Indiana, each year since 1965 (apart from 1972 and 2020), honoring a person or organization whose work has been consistent with the spirit, values, and legacy of Eugene V. Debs and who has contributed to the advancement of the causes of industrial unionism, social justice, or world peace.

== Recipients ==
Year	Recipient	Field	Description
1965	John L. Lewis	Industrial Unionism	Labor leader, served as president of the United Mine Workers of America from 1920 to 1960.
1966	Norman Thomas	World Peace	American Presbyterian minister who achieved fame as a socialist, pacifist, and six-time presidential candidate for the Socialist Party of America.
1967	A. Philip Randolph	Industrial Unionism, Social Justice	Civil rights leader, labor leader, socialist political leader.
1968	Walter Reuther	Industrial Unionism	American labor union leader, who made the United Automobile Workers a major force not only in the auto industry but also in the Democratic Party and the Congress of Industrial Organizations in the mid-20th century.
1969	H.E. Gilbert	Industrial Unionism	President, Brotherhood of Locomotive Firemen and Enginemen
1970	Patrick E. Gorman	Industrial Unionism	President, Amalgamated Meat Cutters
1971	Dorothy Day	Social Justice, World Peace	American journalist, and social activist
1973	Michael Harrington	Social Justice	American democratic socialist, writer, and political activist
1974	Arthur M. Schlesinger Jr.	Social Justice	American historian, social critic, and public intellectual
1975	Ruben Levin	Industrial Unionism	Founder, Labor Press Associates Manager and editor of LABOR magazine
1976	Martin H. Miller	Industrial Unionism	National Legislative Representative for the Brotherhood of Railroad Trainmen
1977	Frank Zeidler	Social Justice	American Socialist politician and Mayor of Milwaukee, Wisconsin
1978	Jesse Jackson	Social Justice	American civil rights activist, Baptist minister, and politician
1979	Pete Seeger	Social Justice	American folk singer and social activist
1980	William W. Winpisinger	Industrial Unionism	International President, International Association of Machinists and Aerospace Workers
1981	Kurt Vonnegut	Social Justice, World Peace	American writer
1982	Coretta Scott King	Social Justice	American author, activist, civil rights leader, and the widow of Martin Luther King Jr.
1983	Studs Terkel	Social Justice	American author, historian, actor, and broadcaster
1984	William H. Wynn	Industrial Unionism	Founder/Organizer, United Food and Commercial Workers
1985	Jack Sheinkman	Industrial Unionism	President, Amalgamated Clothing and Textile Workers Union
1986	Joseph L. Rauh Jr.	Social Justice	Civil rights and civil liberties attorney
1987	Ed Asner	Social Justice, Industrial Unionism	Actor, activist, president, Screen Actors Guild
1988	Joyce D. Miller	Social Justice, Industrial Unionism	Labor activist, feminist, founding member of the Coalition of Labor Union Women
1989	Morton Bahr	Industrial Unionism	President, Communications Workers of America
1990	Lynn R. Williams	Industrial Unionism	Canadian labour leader; President, United Steelworkers
1991	John Sayles	Social Justice	American independent film director, screenwriter, editor, actor and novelist
1992	Ralph Nader	Social Justice	American political activist, author, lecturer, and attorney
1993	Dolores Huerta	Industrial Unionism, Social Justice	American labor leader and civil rights activist; Co-founder, National Farmworkers Association
1994	Richard Trumka	Industrial Unionism	Organized labor leader; President, United Mine Workers
1995	Jim Hightower	Social Justice	American syndicated columnist, progressive political activist, and author
1996	Victor Saul Navasky	Social Justice	American journalist, editor and academic
1997	John Sweeney	Industrial Unionism	Labor leader; President, AFL–CIO
1998	Howard Zinn	Social Justice, World Peace	American historian, playwright, and social activist
1999	Gloria Tapscott Johnson	Social Justice, Industrial Unionism	American unionist, labor feminist
2000	Michael Sullivan	Industrial Unionism	President, Sheet Metal Workers' International Association
2001	Al Chesser	Industrial Unionism	National Legislative Director, United Transportation Union
2002	Julian Bond	Social Justice	Social activist, civil rights leader, politician, professor and writer
2003	Molly Ivins	Social Justice	American newspaper columnist, author, political commentator, and humorist
2004	Bruce S. Raynor	Industrial Unionism	Unionist; President, Workers United; General President of UNITE HERE
2005	Thomas Frank	Social Justice	American political analyst, historian, journalist, and columnist
2006	Brave New Films	Social Justice	Media/news/documentary company
2007	Barbara Ehrenreich	Social Justice	American author and political activist
2008	Cecil Roberts	Industrial Unionism	President, United Mine Workers of America
2009	Ron Gettelfinger	Industrial Unionism	President, United Auto Workers
2010	Bobby Duvall	Social Justice	Human rights advocate
2011	Danny Glover	Social Justice	Actor, civil rights activist, political activist
2012	Clayola Brown	Industrial Unionism, Social Justice	Union leader, civil rights activist
2013	Eliseo Medina	Industrial Unionism, Social Justice	Mexican-American labor union activist
2014	Sara Horowitz	Industrial Unionism	Founder, Freelancers Union
2015	Jim Boland	Industrial Unionism	President, International Union of Bricklayers and Allied Craftworkers
2016	Cindy Sheehan	World Peace, Social Justice	Peace activist, political activist
2017	Jobs With Justice	Industrial Unionism, Social Justice	Labor equality organization
2018	William "Bill" Lucy	Industrial Unionism, Social Justice	Union leader, Civil rights activist
2019	Mary Kay Henry	on behalf of the SEIU	Labor and civil rights activist
2021	Innocence Project	Social Justice	Legal advocacy organization
2022	A. Philip Randolph Institute	Industrial Unionism, Social Justice	African-American trade unionists organization
2023	Lynne Fox	Industrial Unionism	President, Workers United
2024	Sara Nelson	Industrial Unionism	President, Association of Flight Attendants
2025	Bernie Sanders	Industrial Unionism	Senator, US Congress

== See also ==
- List of awards for contributions to society
- List of peace prizes
