= Mollie Lieber West =

US labor activist

Mollie Lieber West (January 2, 1916 – August 7, 2015) was a labor activist and leader. Born in Sokolow, Poland, she emigrated with her parents to the United States at the age of 13 and settled in Chicago, where she faced challenges adapting due to the language barrier and a physical disability. After organizing a strike against Depression-era cuts to the arts at her high school, West graduated and became involved in labor organizing.

From 1935 to 1962 she was a member of the Communist Party USA and from 1953 to 1955 lived in hiding and was under FBI surveillance. Later, after renouncing her Communist Party membership, she became active again in trade unions, served as a delegate to several national union organizations, and co-founded the Chicago chapter of the Coalition of Labor Union Women. Later in life, she was recognized by multiple organizations for her contributions to labor history.

== Early life ==
Mollie Lieber West (born Malka Shieman) was born in Sokolow, Poland. Due to complications at her birth, West walked with a painful limp throughout her life. Her parents, Harry Sheiman and Minka Sheiman, also had a son, Louis, and the family emigrated to the United States in 1929. She adopted an English name, Mollie, and due to her lack of English she was put into the first grade. However, she caught up quickly and began high school in 1931.

Early experience organizing strikes led West to a life of labor activism. Teachers in Chicago had been paid so infrequently from 1931 to 1933 that they and students held strikes against the pay cuts and school funding cuts, which led to the creation of the Chicago Teachers Union in 1937. West supported her teachers and was inspired by them. In 1934, when her high school proposed cuts to the music department, including the orchestra where she played French horn, Mollie West organized a strike. The night before the strike, she and several classmates were arrested while preparing their banners. She identified this as "the radicalizing moment in her life."

After high school, West worked for the Farm Equipment Workers of America, where she "ran the office, wrote and distributed printed materials, and advocated community members to support strikes- at any cost." West was present at the Memorial Day massacre of 1937 and not only led the singing but spoke out against police brutality after the violence had occurred.

== Communist Party affiliation ==
Joining the Communist Party USA in 1935 as a labor organizer for the Young Communist League USA, West later became the secretary for the Illinois Communist Party. She married her first husband, Carl Lieber, a journalist and fellow Communist sympathizer on June 30, 1940. In 1943, as his friends were volunteering to serve in World War II, Carl Lieber volunteered for the United States Army and was sent to Europe. In his absence, Mollie, who was pregnant with their child, lost the pregnancy in a stillbirth and nearly died, and was saved by friends who "crowded the hospital to donate blood for her." Carl only read the news two weeks later in a letter from a friend. In January 1945, Carl was killed in a car crash near Nice. To stay busy, West "served as an American Delegate to the World Youth Congress held in London and the World Student Congress in Czechoslovakia." While in Europe, she traveled to various other conventions and visited her husband's grave, possibly becoming the first American widow of World War II to do so.

In 1948, Mollie Lieber married James West, a fellow Communist organizer, and in 1951 they adopted their son, Stephen. However, due to government attention surrounding their Communist activities, James West went "underground," moving constantly, and in 1952 Mollie and her son did the same, changing Chicago-area residences at least 20 times. The FBI maintained a profile and surveillance of Mollie West and attempted to contact her on at least one occasion. In 1962, she renounced her Communist Party membership, stating that "while she believed in their principals, it was not her life."

== Continuing labor career ==
After separating from James West in 1966 and obtaining a divorce in 1969, West continued her activism while raising her son as a single mother. Taking temporary work as a proofreader, West pursued night school training at the Washburne Trade School in the printing trade, where women were very rare.

As the first woman elected to the executive board of her union, the Chicago Typographical Union (CTU) Local 16, West served as one of the six women out of 350 delegates at the International Typographical Union convention in San Diego, California. "That same year, West was the first woman to address the International Convention Union Council, the first female elected to the Executive Committee of CTU, and the first female appointed delegate to the Illinois state AFL–CIO (American Federation of Labor-Coalition of Industrial Organizations). For over thirty years she served as a delegate to the Chicago Federation of Labor as well as to the Illinois State AFL–CIO. As founding member of CLUW (Coalition of Labor Union Women), West served on the national executive board."

In 1966, West began studying at Mundelein College in the Weekend College to earn a bachelor's degree in labor education, and when she graduated two years later, she suggested that Mundelein College invite civil rights movement and labor activist Addie L. Wyatt to give the commencement address, and West was given the role of introducing her.

At the age of 71, West was forced to retire from her career in printing. She remained a member of her union but suffered extreme depression after the loss of her community and attempted to commit suicide. Through support from her son, family, and friends, she was able to recover and became more involved with the Coalition of Labor Union Women and the Illinois Labor History Society, where she volunteered as a full-time secretary.

West became active in Chicago politics in the 48th Ward, "supporting and befriending women politicians, including Alderman Mary Ann Smith and Illinois State Senator Carol Ronen."

In 1990, West was inducted into the Chicago Women's Hall of Fame, and in 1998, the Lake County American Federation of Labor-Congress of Industrial Organizations named Mollie Lieber West Person of the Year.
