= Muriel Tuteur =

American labor activist

Muriel "Manny" Tuteur
- 1984 CLUW Convention, Chicago
- Born: Muriel Friedman; May 17, 1922; Chicago, Cook County, Illinois
- Died: February 3, 2016 (aged 93); Laguna Hills, Orange County, California
- Other names: Manny Tuteur, Muriel Friedman Tuteur
- Occupations: Labor organizer, child care and women's rights activist
- Years active: 1943-2001
- Known for: directing the first union-sponsored child care center in the US and co-founding the Chicago chapter of the CLUW

Muriel "Manny" Tuteur (1922–2016) was an American labor activist who was a charter member of the Coalition of Labor Union Women and a founding member of the Chicago Day Care Council. She was the director of the Amalgamated Day Care and Health Center from 1969 to 1983, the first union-sponsored day care center in the United States. During this time, she was one of the founders of the Chicago branch of the Coalition of Labor Union Women and served as its president from 1978 to 1982. From 1983 to 1994 she served as the Assistant Director of Education and Political Action for the Chicago branch of the Amalgamated Clothing and Textile Workers Union (ACTWU). When ACTWU merged with the International Ladies' Garment Workers' Union (ILGWU) to form Union of Needletrades, Industrial and Textile Employees (UNITE), Tuteur served as the Assistant Education Director for the Chicago and Central States Board until her retirement. She received many awards and honors during her career, including the Hannah G. Solomon Award from the National Council of Jewish Women in 1988, and was an inductee into the Chicago Women's Hall of Fame in 1989.

== Early life ==
Muriel "Manny" Friedman was born on May 17, 1922, in Chicago, Cook County, Illinois, as the youngest child in a family of nine children of Romanian-Jewish immigrants. After completing her secondary education, Friedman enrolled in the University of Chicago.

== Career ==
While still studying, in 1943, Friedman took a job as a milling machine operator at the South Works plant of U.S. Steel. A few months after starting the job she graduated with a B.A. in sociology. Working at the plant, she met Charles Tuteur, a German Jew who had fled Nazi Germany and they married that same year. The following year, the young couple moved to Vancouver, Washington, where she became a ship fitter and welder at the Kaiser Shipyards. They tried to enlist together but Charles was rejected due to injuries sustained during a civilian imprisonment by the Nazis before his escape. Manny was accepted into the Women's Army Corps and sent to basic training in Ft. Benning, Georgia, where she then completed parachute school. She returned to Vancouver, working in the shipyard until 1945.

When the war ended, the couple returned to Chicago, where Tuteur worked as a caseworker for the Cook County Bureau of Public Welfare, and taught at several preschools hosted by the Jewish Community Center. She earned a master's degree in early childhood education from Chicago State University and applied for a job with the Amalgamated Clothing and Textile Workers Union (ACTWU), which was looking for someone to start a child care program for workers in 1969. It was the first union-sponsored day care program in the United States and was funded by a negotiated percentage of salaries paid to workers by the contribution of clothing manufacturers. The center provided, at no cost to union workers, care for 3 to 6-year-old children, which included free health and dental assessments and twice-weekly meetings with a psychiatric social worker.

During her tenure at the ACTWU Child Care Center, Tuteur made several trips abroad to study childcare and labor. In 1977, she visited France, Israel and Sweden with a group sponsored by the German Marshall Fund. The group included Clara Day of the Teamsters Union and the women spent a week in each country evaluating how trade unions dealt with the needs of their female workforce. In 1980, Tuteur and Day made a similar trip to China with a group sponsored by Trade Unions of China. The ACTWU went on to open similar centers in Maryland and Virginia, based on the Chicago model Tuteur directed. She managed the program from its opening until 1983, when it was closed due to economic constrictions. In 1982, Tuteur received the Florence Criley Award, which was presented by the Coalition of Labor Union Women. The following year, Tuteur became the ACTWU's Assistant Director of Education and Political Action and served in that capacity for more than a decade. In 1995, when the ACTWU merged with the International Ladies' Garment Workers' Union (ILGWU) to form Union of Needletrades, Industrial and Textile Employees (UNITE), she became the Assistant Education Director for the Chicago and Central States Board and remained in that position until her 2001 retirement.

Tuteur was one of the founding members of the Chicago chapter of the Coalition of Labor Union Women (CLUW) and served as its president from 1978 to 1982. She also served on the National executive board of CLUW and was a long-running co-chair of the organization's National Child Care Task Force. In 1984, she was appointed to serve on an advisory board established by Senator Paul Simon to evaluate the rollbacks in women's rights which occurred under the Reagan administration. Throughout her career, she served on many local, state and national committees and task forces which dealt with women's and family issues, including the Illinois Women’s Agenda, the National Implementation Task Force for the White House Conference on Families, and Women for Economic Justice. In 1988, she was the recipient of the Hannah G. Solomon Award from the National Council of Jewish Women and the following year was inducted into the Chicago Women's Hall of Fame. After she retired, Tuteur moved to California but continued to be active, registering voters, participating in demonstrations and serving as an officer of the National Council of Jewish Women.

== Death and legacy ==
Tuteur died on February 3, 2016, at the Saddleback Memorial Hospital of Laguna Hills and was buried on 17 March 2016 at the Riverside National Cemetery in Riverside, California. Her papers, containing information on women's and labor rights, were donated to the Walter P. Reuther Library at Wayne State University.
