= Chicago Cultural Center =

Historic building in Chicago, Illinois

- Chicago Public Library, Central Building
- U.S. National Register of Historic Places
- Chicago Landmark
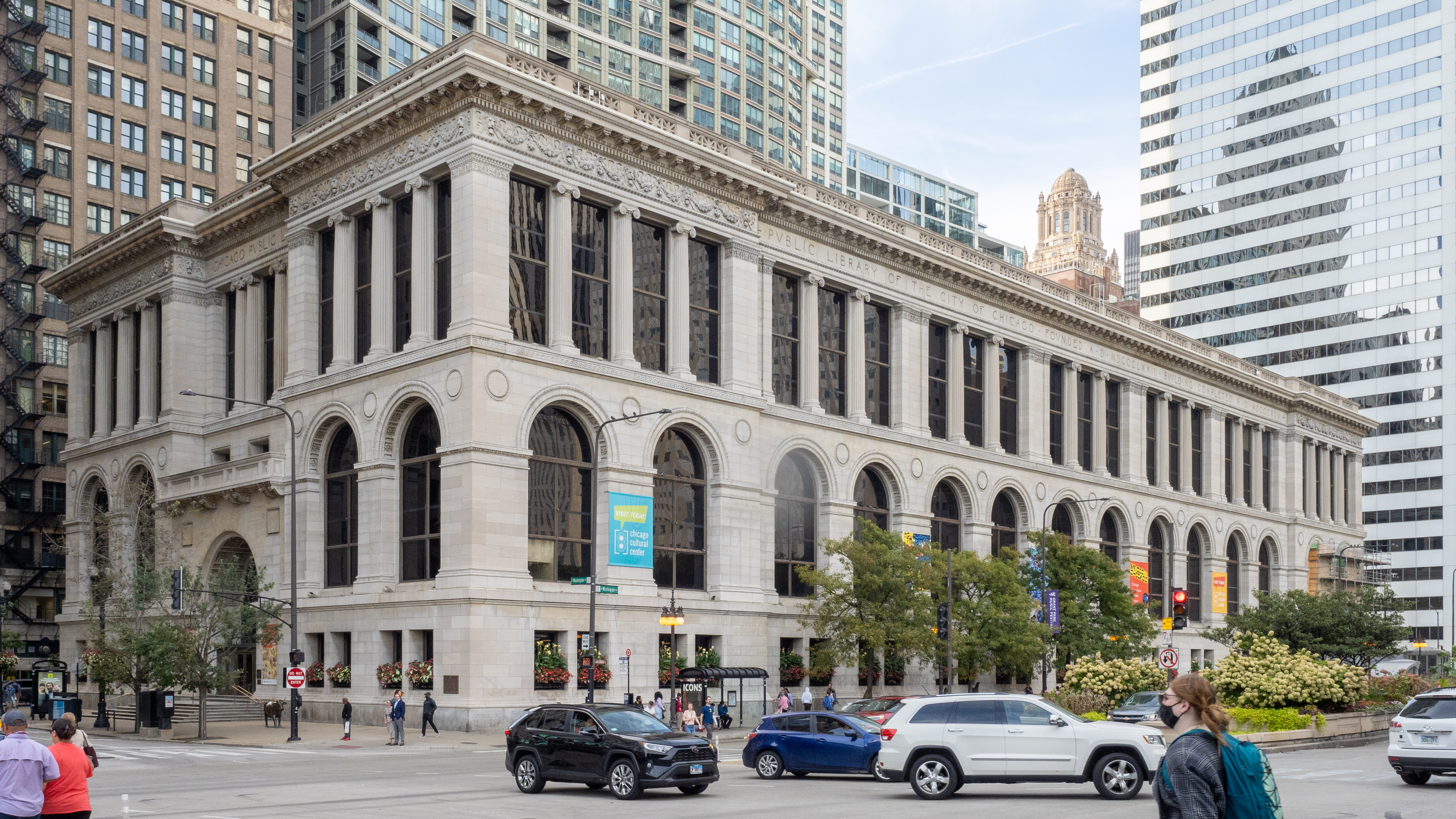
- Chicago Cultural Center

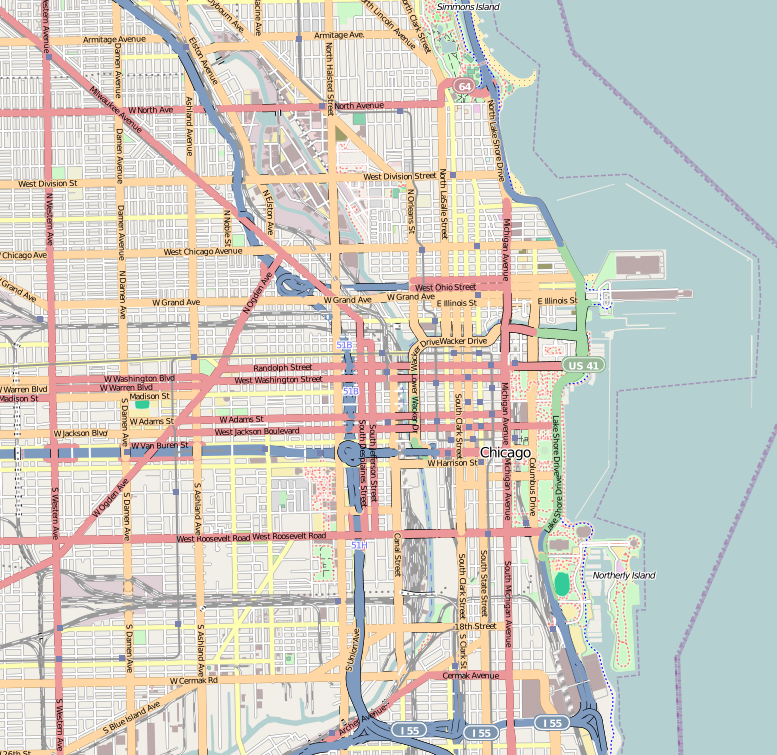
- Location within Central Chicago Location within Illinois Location within the United States
- Location: 78 E. Washington St., Chicago, IL, United States
- Coordinates: 41°53′2″N 87°37′30″W
- Built: 1897
- Architects: C. A. Coolidge, Robert C. Spencer
- NRHP reference No.: 72000449

Significant dates
- Added to NRHP: July 31, 1972
- Designated CHICL: November 15, 1976

Preston Bradley Grand Hall and Tiffany domes

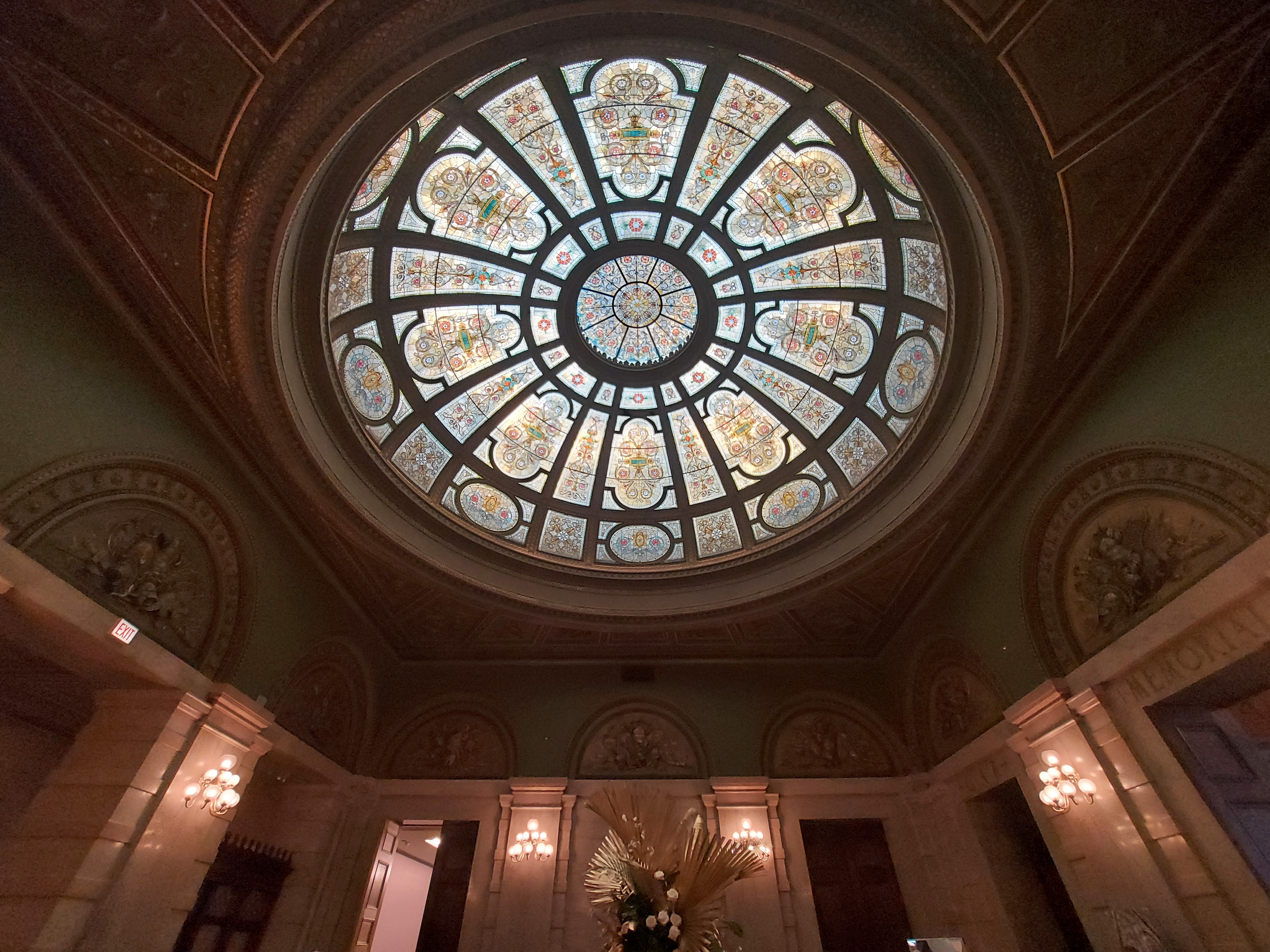
Preston Bradley Hall

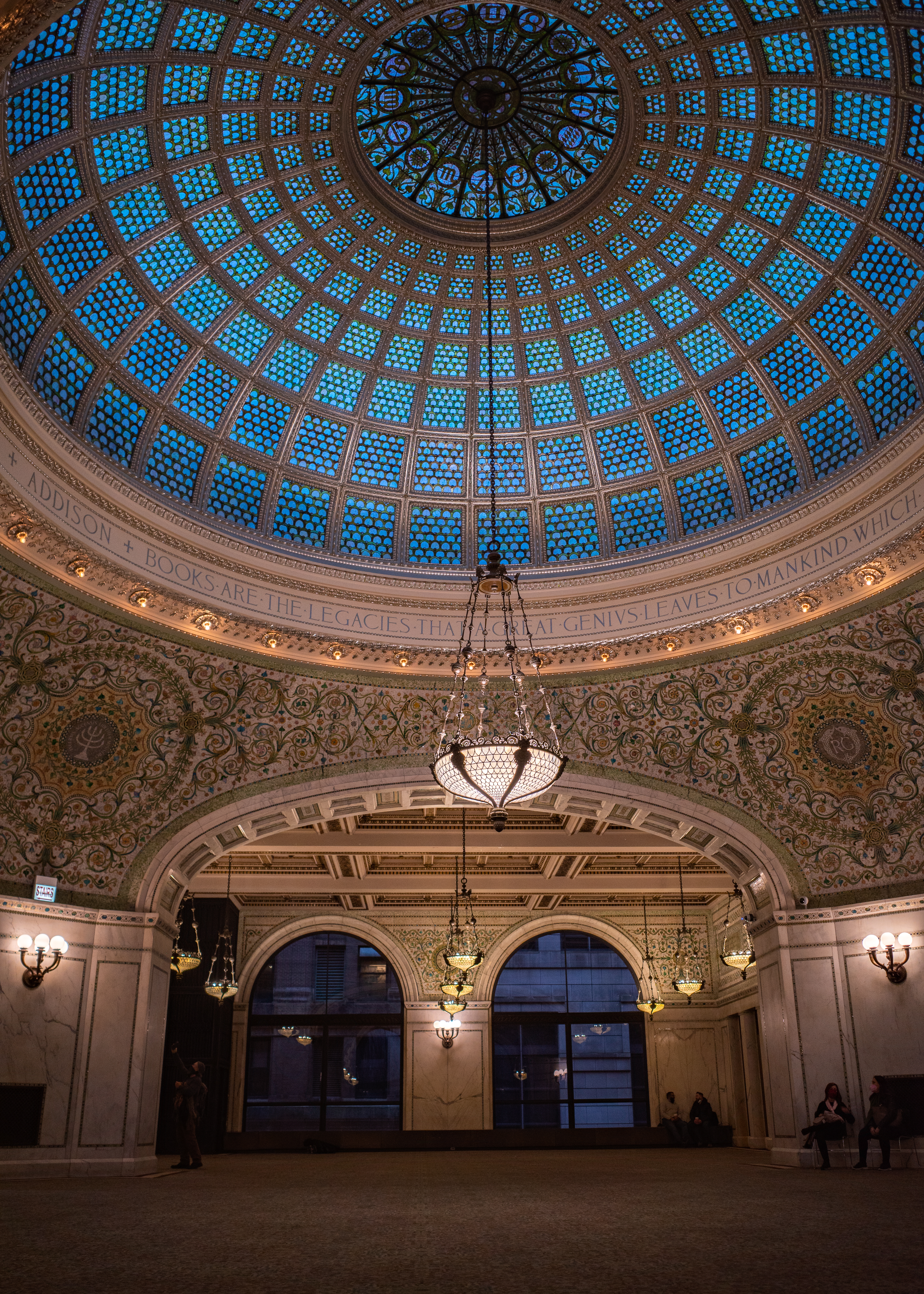
Preston Bradley Hall and Tiffany glass dome

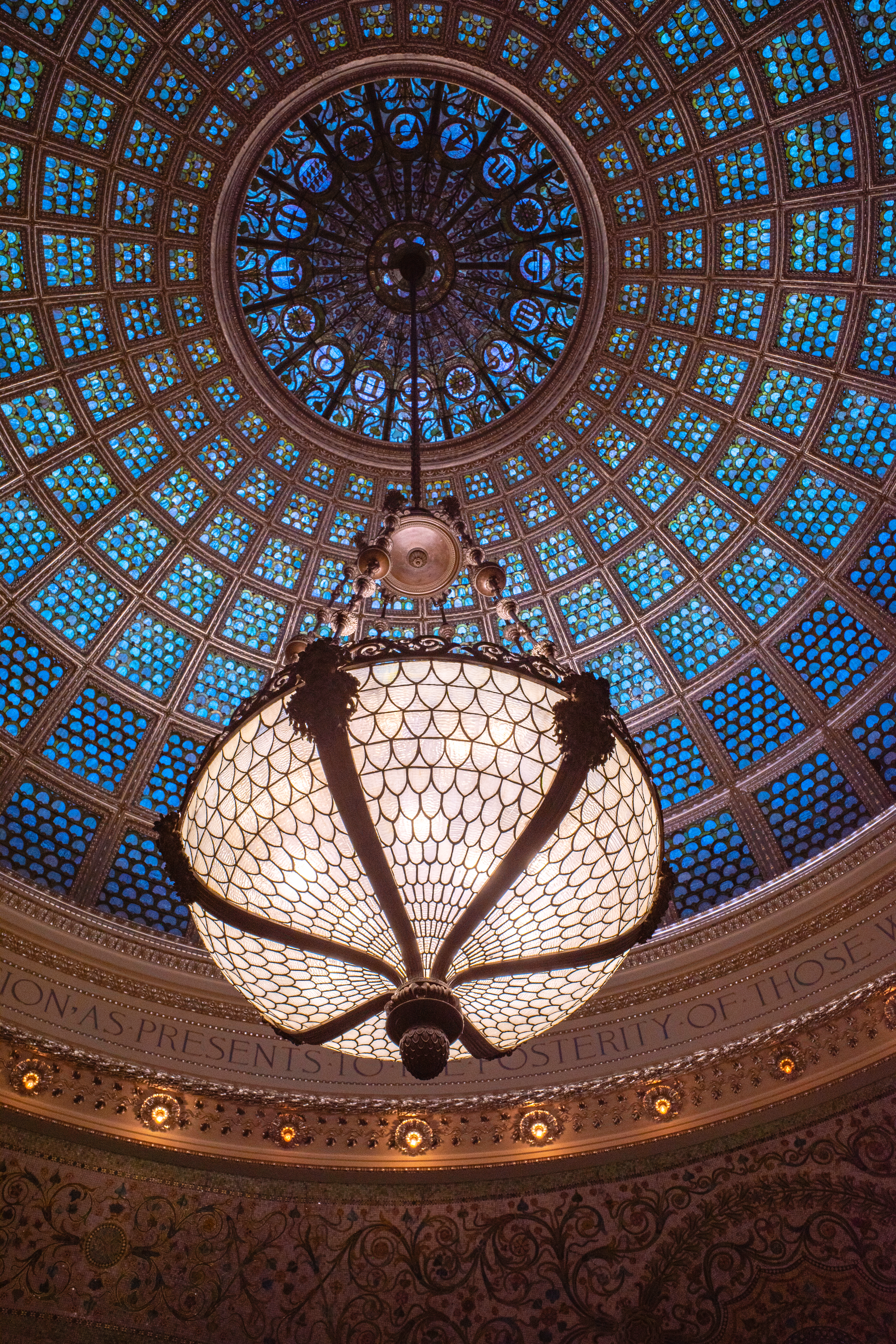
Tiffany glass dome

The Chicago Cultural Center, opened in 1897, is a national landmark operated by Chicago's Department of Cultural Affairs and Special Events. The neoclassical building houses the city's official reception venue, where the Mayor of Chicago has welcomed presidents, royalty, diplomats, and community leaders. It is located in the Loop, across Michigan Avenue from Millennium Park.

Originally the main library of the Chicago Public Library and a memorial hall, the building was converted in 1978 to an arts and culture center at the instigation of Commissioner of Cultural Affairs Lois Weisberg. The city's central library is now located across the Loop in the spacious, postmodern-style Harold Washington Library Center, which opened in 1991.

As the nation's first free municipal cultural center, the Chicago Cultural Center is one of the city's most popular attractions and is considered one of the most comprehensive arts showcases in the United States. Each year, the Chicago Cultural Center features more than 1,000 programs and exhibitions covering a wide range of the performing, visual and literary arts. It also serves as headquarters for the Chicago Children's Choir.

== Architecture ==
The building was designed by Boston architectural firm Shepley, Rutan and Coolidge for the city's central library, and Grand Army of the Republic (GAR) meeting hall and memorial in 1892. The land was donated by the GAR and the building was completed in 1897 at a cost of nearly $2 million (equivalent to $77.4 million in 2025).

It is organized as a four-story north wing (77 East Randolph entrance) and a five-story south wing (78 East Washington entrance), 104 ft (32 m) tall, with 3-foot-thick (0.91 m) masonry walls faced with Bedford Blue Limestone on a granite base. The building is designed in a generally neoclassical style, with Italian Renaissance elements. It is capped with two stained-glass domes, set symmetrically atop the two wings. Key points of architectural interest are as follows:

- Randolph Street entrance and stairway - Entrance with doric columns, mahogany doors, and entry hall with coffered ceiling and walls of green-veined Vermont marble. The curving stairway is faced with Knoxville pink marble, and features mosaics and ornate bronze balusters.
- Washington Street entrance, lobby, and grand staircase - Arched portal, bronze-framed doors, and a three-story, vaulted lobby with walls of white Carrara marble and mosaics. The staircase is also of white Carrara marble, set with medallions of green marble from Connemara, Ireland, and intricate mosaics of Favrile glass, stone, and mother of pearl. The stairway to the 5th floor was inspired by Venice's Bridge of Sighs.
- Grand Army of the Republic Memorial - A large hall and rotunda in the north wing. The hall is faced with deep green Vermont marble, broken by a series of arches for windows and mahogany doors. The rotunda features 30 ft (9.1 m) walls of Knoxville pink marble, mosaic floor, and a fine, stained-glass dome in Renaissance pattern by the firm of Healy and Millet.
- Sidney R. Yates Gallery - replica of an assembly hall in the Doge's Palace, Venice, with heavily ornamented pilasters and coffered ceiling.
- Preston Bradley Hall - A large, ornately patterned room of curving white Carrara marble, capped with a 38 ft (12 m) Tiffany glass dome designed by artist J. A. Holzer using glass and turtleback jewels manufactured by Kokomo Opalescent Glass. The Cultural Center states this to be the largest Tiffany dome in the world.

== Renovation ==
The Chicago Cultural Center underwent an extensive renovation during 2021–2022 with the goal of unearthing the original beauty of the building. The detailed restoration of the art glass dome and decorative finishes in the Grand Army of the Republic rooms, a Civil War memorial, was made possible by a grant of services valued at over $15 million to the City of Chicago. The Chicago Cultural Center is home to two noteworthy stained glass domes. Chicago-based Harboe Architects was awarded the project.

The scope of the project included recreating long-lost light fixtures, cleaning and polishing old marble, restoring mahogany doors, installing new glass, and removing layers of paint in the historic rooms. Also included in the scope was the complete restoration of the 40 ft (12 m) diameter Tiffany-designed stained glass dome, which had become covered in grime and paint. The dome contains over 60,000 individual pieces of glass. Daprato Rigali Studios of Chicago performed the stained-glass dome restoration. During the 2022 restoration, a cement-and-copper cover placed over the Grand Army of the Republic dome in the 1940s was replaced with a transparent covering, allowing natural light through the dome again.

== Past exhibitions ==
Crossroads: Modernism in Ukraine, 1910–1930 was a display of art by Ukrainian artists, such as Sukher Ber Rybak, Vsevolod Maskymovych, and Oleksandr Bohomazov, to name a few. Crossroads was organized by the Foundation for International Arts and Education with the National Art Museum of Ukraine. It was presented by the Chicago Department of Cultural Affairs and the Kyiv Committee of the Chicago Sister Cities International Program. The exhibition ran from July 22, 2006 until October 15, 2006.

Richard Hunt: Sixty Years of Sculpture was a major exhibition of sixty sculptures spanning Hunt's career. The exhibition drew primarily from his extensive "self-collection", lent to the center for the show. This exhibition ran from December 6, 2014, through March 29, 2015.

== "Rush More" mural ==
In 2017, Kerry James Marshall was commissioned to produce an inaugural mural for a public arts program. The mural entitled "Rush More" is located on the west façade of the cultural center. The piece is an homage to women who have contributed to the culture of Chicago.

Portrayed are:

- Gwendolyn Brooks
- Abena Joan Brown
- Cheryl Lynn Bruce
- Margaret Burroughs
- Sandra Cisneros
- Maggie Daley
- Sandra Delgado
- Barbara Gaines
- Susanne Ghez
- Joan Gray
- Monica Haslip
- Barbara Jones-Hogu
- Harriet Monroe
- Achy Obejas
- Ruth Page
- Jacqueline Russell
- Jane Saks
- Jackie Taylor
- Lois Weisberg
- Oprah Winfrey

Washington painted the mural on a scale rendering of the building. The piece was then transposed to the actual façade by the muralist Jeff Zimmerman. Financing for the project was made possible by the non-profit, Murals of Acceptance and through philanthropic donations from David Arquette, Patricia Arquette, Marc Benioff, and Lynne Benioff.

== See also ==
- Chicago architecture
- List of museums and cultural institutions in Chicago
