= Preston Bradley Center =

Historic building in Chicago, Illinois, US

Coordinates: 41.9689°N 87.6539°W

- Alternative names: The Peoples Church of Chicago

General information
- Status: Owned by Daniel Ivankovich
- Type: Classical Revival style
- Location: Chicago, Illinois, U.S.
- Address: 941 W. Lawrence Avenue, Chicago, Illinois 60640
- Country: United States of America
- Groundbreaking: 1925
- Owner: Daniel Ivankovich

Design and construction
- Architect(s): J.E.O. Pridmore (1867-1940)

Website
- www.prestonbradleycenter.org

The Preston Bradley Center is a nationally registered historic building in the Uptown neighborhood of Chicago, Illinois, United States. Its creators designed the site as a center for arts and culture. The building was constructed in 1925, and designed by British-American architect J.E.O. Pridmore. In 2000 the building was placed on the Federal Register of Historic Places by the United States Department of the Interior. In 2015, the City of Chicago began the process of designating the Preston Bradley Center as a historic landmark. It is named after Preston Bradley, a pastor in Chicago. The landmark was occupied by Peoples Church in 1926, then sold to the Chicago orthopedist Daniel Ivankovich in 2022. Two of the building's most important interior rooms are the auditorium, which has two balconies, and a mural by Chicago artist Louis Grell; and Mason Hall, adorned with artwork suggesting Bradley's ties to the masons.
