= Willa Mae Sudduth =

American activist (1925–2015)

- Born: October 28, 1925; Koran, Louisiana
- Died: November 14, 2015 (aged 90); Berkeley, California, U.S.
- Occupations: Social Justice Facilitator & Organizer; workplace discrimination, Labor Movement

Willa Mae Sudduth (1925–2015) was one of the founders of the Coalition of Labor Union Women. She was involved in many social justice causes, issues, and concerns most of her adult life. She was an African-American woman and the mother of six children.

She was made woman of the year for El Cerrito, California, in 2011 by California Assemblywoman Nancy Skinner. Ms. Skinner gave awards each year while in office to honor women in her district that had made accomplishments.

Sudduth lived in El Cerrito for more than 30 years, and she previously lived in Berkeley and Richmond, California.

== Early life ==
She was born Willa Mae Smith in Koran, Louisiana, to Willie Clint Smith, Sr. and Earnestine Mims. She grew up in the Northern region of Louisiana, in Haughton. Like most southern girls, she had to study home economics. Growing up, she attended a Rosenwald School for colored children. She lived in Florida and Colorado before moving to California.

== Parchester Village ==
The Smith family lived in Parchester Village, where they moved from World War II temporary housing in North Richmond, California, where the WWII Kaiser Shipyards were located. Parchester Village was a planned development that was the first subdivision in Richmond to sell homes to African Americans. The temporary shipyard houses were being torn town. Sudduth and her husband bought a home in the new community, called Parchester Village, which is situated near Point Pinole Regional Shoreline between the Santa Fe and Southern Pacific railroad tracks. Local African-American pastors worked together along with local politicians, community leaders, and developer Fred Parr to get housing built for African Americans, and all others in need of housing after World War II. Although the 400 home Parchester Village was advertised as a "community for all Americans", due to racial attitudes it became an all-black suburban community. Parchester village developed out of the need for housing after the influx of American Americans came to the Richmond shipyards for work and opportunities. Many African Americans between 1940 and 1945 migrated to Richmond, California to work for the Richmond Shipyards. This was known as the Second Great Migration (African American). It has been estimated that over 500,000 African Americans migrated to California between 1942 and 1945. They came for jobs, and with the hopes of living a better life devoid of racially motived 'Jim Crow' violence of the South. Parchester became a refuge, within a refuge in that the marsh area next to the village was a sanctuary.

The Richmond Shipyards built more Victory ships, critical to American supply lines in World War II, than any other shipyard. They used assembly line techniques. Richmond became a boom town. It underwent sudden, rapid population and economic growth. There was a massive influx of people from all over the United States. The influx of African Americans came mostly from the South (United States). They came for jobs, opportunities, and a new way of life. They quickly discovered that the West was just as racist as the south, and that Jim Crow laws were alive, and well in the shipyards of Richmond, California.

In May 1941, A. Philip Randolph, the head of the Brotherhood of Sleeping Car Porters, sent out a Call to Black Americans to March on Washington, D.C., to convince President Franklin D. Roosevelt to issue an Executive Order to end racial discrimination in the armed forces and employment for Blacks in the expanding defense industries and government agencies. He threatened a March on Washington of 150,000 Blacks "to wake up and shock white America as it has never been shocked before." The Call and the threat of a mass March on Washington, D.C., Lincoln Monument was so effective that a week before the March, F. D. Roosevelt issue Executive Order 8802, Fair Employment Practice Committee to eliminate racial discrimination in the armed forces and for federal defense industries to practice fair employment to Black Americans.

We call upon you to fight for jobs in National Defense. We call upon you to struggle for the integration of Negroes in the armed forces... The Negroes' stake in national defense is big. It consists of jobs, thousands of jobs. It may represent millions, yes hundreds of millions of dollars in wages. It consists of new industrial opportunities and hope. This is worth fighting for. A. Philip Randolph

While "whites" did not want to move into Parchester, black families took on the task of building community. Parchester became a tight knit community of working and middle class black homeowners. A community where neighbors looked after each other. Sudduth, like most of the homeowners, was very proud of their efforts, victories, and community. They waged and won many victories in their struggle to build community and families. They sued for the right to send their children to Richmond Public Schools. They had a Parchester Veterans Wives Club. They organized a Parchester Village Improvement Association with dues-paying homeowners. They put pressure on the county for services. They lobbied to get street lighting, sewage, telephone, and transportation service. Sudduth was active in the early years of community building in Parchester. Sudduth was known as Willa Mae Daniels when she married J. Daniels, her first husband. Parchester Village has continued to preserve the semi-rural environment. A recent victory is the preservation of Breuner Marsh to continue to be an "Open Space" area, as it was originally intended during the construction of Parchester Village.

Sudduth studied at Laney College in Oakland, California. After studying at Laney College she was able to get a sewing position in the sewing industry. She also took courses at U.C. Berkeley in labor and urban studies, which allowed her to get a job with the machinists’ union as an employee assistance director. She worked for the machinists’ union until she retired.

Her early experiences in California as a migrant African-American woman has been documented in the 1996 book by Gretchen Lemke-Santangelo, Abiding Courage: African American Migration Women and the East Bay Community, which chronicles the lives of several African-American migration women in the East Bay Area communities of San Francisco. These women were a part of the Great Migration to California during WWII. Gretchen Lemke-Santangelo's study examines the migration, and the community-building efforts of the African-American women in the study. African-American women who moved from the South to the East Bay during World War II. The study has more than 50 oral interviews with the African-American women migrants documented in her book. The book details their experience as migrant women with families and children. The book also focuses on how the women used their southern skills and culture to keep their families together and the establishing of new communities.

People from the South were the ones who changed California. We had a history of pulling together as a community and southern black women were always in the forefront of change. Willa Sudduth

== Career ==
In 1974, Sudduth, along with the United States Labor movement and civil rights activist Addie L. Wyatt and others, founded the Coalition of Labor Union Women. CLUW is the only national organization representing U.S. union women. As a labor organizer, she led the substance abuse program for the local district of IAM, International Association of Machinists and Aerospace Workers.

In 1977, she was a union representative for the National Women's Conference that was held in Houston, Texas, from November 18–21, 1977. More than 20,000 attendees were present for this historic event. The conference's primary goal was to create a national plan of action towards gender equality to be given to the U.S. president and Congress. President Jimmy Carter chose New York state representative Bella Abzug and Carmen Delgado Votaw to head preliminary work leading up to the conference in Houston. A bill was created to hold the National Women's conference that would formulate a national plan of action. Five million dollars was allocated for the conference and pre-conference state conventions were held. Bella Abzug, an American lawyer, U.S. Representative, social activist and a leader in the Women's Movement, chaired the conference.

This historic National Women's Conference is documented in the film Sisters of '77. The film documents this unprecedented event in women's history which altered the course of history in America. The women came from all walks of life. Some noted conference attendees were former first ladies Lady Bird Johnson, Betty Ford, and Rosalynn Carter. Influential leaders attending this ground breaking event ushering in and furthering the women's movement included Bella Abzug, Betty Friedan, Gloria Steinem, Eleanor Smeal, Ann Richards, Coretta Scott King, Billie Jean King, and Barbara Jordan. Sudduth represented Labor equality for women in the workplace.

Sudduth served on El Cerrito's Committee on Aging, the West County Senior Coalition, and is a board member for West Contra Costa County League of Women Voters.

She was a member of the National Council of Negro Women.

Sudduth has also served on the State Civil Rights Task Force. She was appointed by former Gov. Jerry Brown.

She worked with the Contra Costa County AIDS/HIV Task Force organizing workshops and awareness.

In May 2011, Sudduth received from the City of El Cerrito a Proclamation by the State Assembly District 14, as Woman of the Year, for her decades of community service work. She has worked for many years within the Methodist Church for the rights of women to be pastors. On January 20, 2014, Sudduth was awarded the Martin Luther King Dream Award during El Cerrito's 25th Anniversary Celebration of Dr. Martin Luther King Jr.
