= Ora Lee Malone =

Ora Lee Malone (née Thomas; 24 December 1918 – 30 October 2012) was an American union organizer and civil rights activist in St. Louis, Missouri.

She was born Ora Lee Thomas on 24 December 1918 in Mississippi, and grew up in Mobile, Alabama, along with her 8 younger siblings. Her father was a railroad worker and her mother a housekeeper. After working for some time as a housekeeper herself in Mobile, Malone moved to St. Louis in 1951 where she found work sewing jackets at the California Manufacturing Plant. In 1956, the workers in the plant unionized and elected her shop steward. She continued with California Manufacturing for nineteen years, before shifting to work for the Amalgamated Clothing and Textile Workers Union itself as a business manager and international representative.

Malone co-founded or helped start several influential organizations, including the Coalition of Labor Union Women, the Coalition of Black Trade Unionists, the National Women's Political Caucus, and the St. Louis branch of the A. Philip Randolph Institute. She campaigned to repeal the Boswell Amendment, for the Equal Rights Amendment, for the renewal of the Voting Rights Act of 1965, and against Apartheid, convincing the city and state governments to divest from South Africa. In 1988 she was recognized with the Calloway Award for her contributions to the struggle for human rights.

Malone was married to Sturdivant Malone and had no children. She died in St. Louis on 30 October 2012.
