= Effie Ellis =

American pediatrician and activist (1913–1994)

Effie O'Neal Ellis
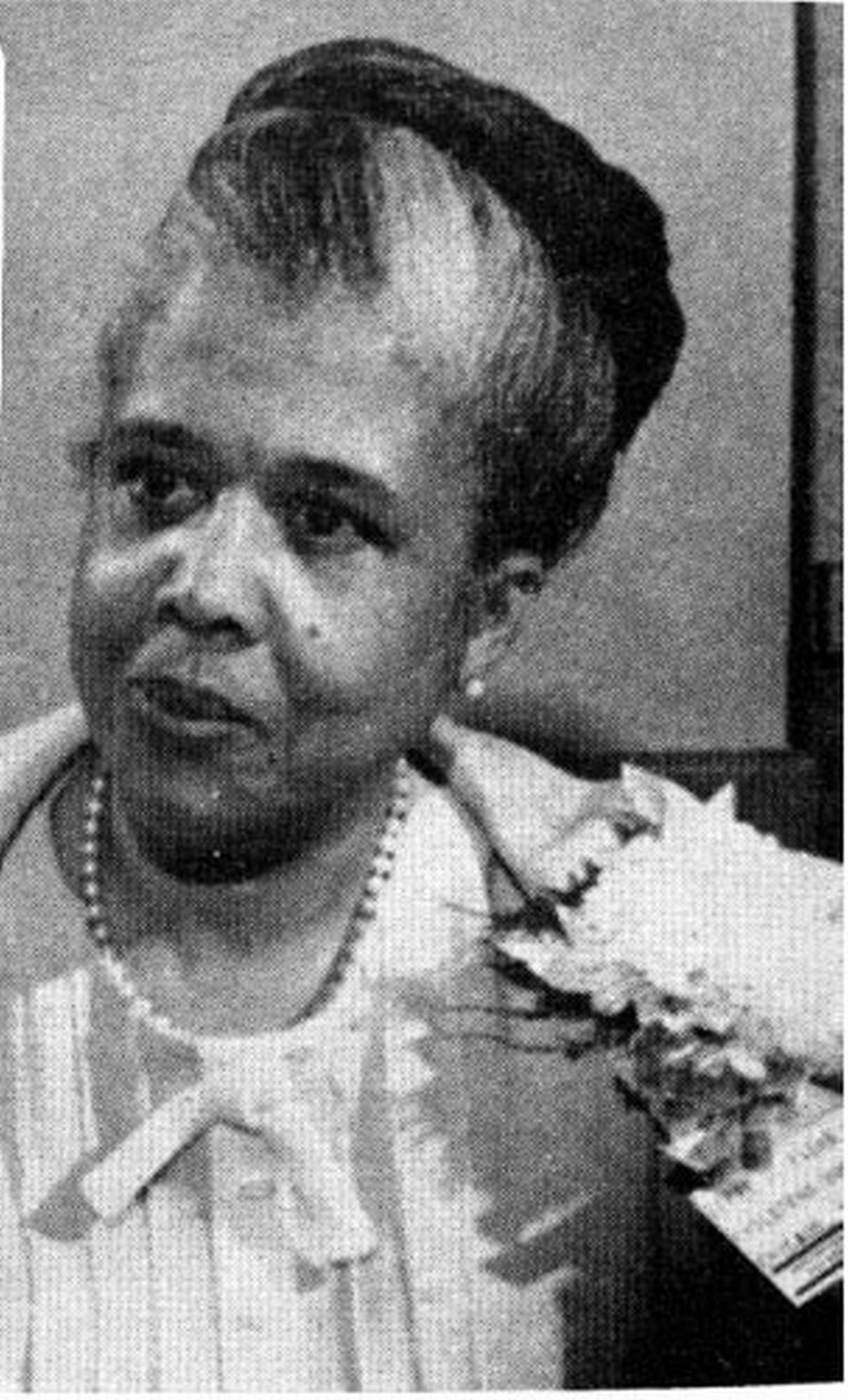
- Undated photograph
- Born: Effie O'Neal; June 15, 1913; Hawkinsville, Georgia, U.S.
- Died: July 5, 1994 (aged 81); Chicago, Illinois, U.S.
- Education: Spelman College; Atlanta University; University of Illinois College of Medicine
- Occupations: Pediatrician; activist
- Known for: Lowering infant mortality rates in Chicago
- Spouses: Arthur. W. Ellis; James D. Solomon

Effie O'Neal Ellis (June 15, 1913 – July 5, 1994) was an American pediatrician, child medical care consultant, and an activist for infant health and maternal education. Ellis was the first African-American woman to hold an executive position in the American Medical Association. In 1989, Ellis was inducted to the Chicago Women's Hall of Fame for her efforts in improving the lives of the black community and helping to lower infant mortality rates.

== Early life and education ==
Ellis was born in Hawkinsville, Georgia, to Joshua P. O'Neal and Althea (Hamilton) O'Neal. In 1933, she obtained her bachelor's degree in Biology and Chemistry upon graduating from Spelman College. Ellis then attended graduate school at Atlanta University, where she acquired a master's degree in biology in 1935. In 1950, Ellis graduated with honors from University of Illinois College of Medicine, where she was fifth in her class.

== Career and accomplishments ==
Following graduate school, she was presented with a grant to study diseases and parasites in Puerto Rico, which prompted her passion for healthcare for all socioeconomic backgrounds. Ellis served as a pediatric residency at Massachusetts General Hospital from 1951 to 1952. Her primary concerns were with the black community, children, and child mortality rates. She aided in the development of parenting and education programs for the March of Dimes. She dedicated much of her treating and advising to new and expecting mothers.

Ellis obtained a postdoctoral fellowship studying pediatric cardiology at Johns Hopkins University School of Medicine from July 1, 1952, to June 30, 1953. She was a specialist in maternal, prenatal, postnatal, and preventative health care. Her team helped to develop the technique to help save blue babies (those infants with inadequate oxygen supply). In 1970, Ellis became the first African-American woman to hold an executive position in the American Medical Association, in which role she served for five years. She became a Director of Maternal Care and Health Care for Ohio's Department of Health in 1960. During her time in Ohio, she also served as acting director of the Charles R. Drew Comprehensive Neighborhood Health Center (a Model Cities-funded facility) in Dayton, Ohio. In 1970, Ellis was appointed to the President's Committee on the Handicapped. Ellis was inducted the Chicago Women's Hall of Fame in 1989.

== Personal life and death ==
Ellis married Arthur. W. Ellis in 1935 and later married James D. Solomon on March 23, 1953. She died in Northwestern Memorial Hospital on July 5, 1994.
