= Gloria T. Johnson =

Gloria Tapscott Johnson (October 28, 1927 – February 13, 2013) was an American labor unionist.

Born in Washington, D.C. as Gloria Delores Tapscott, she studied at Howard University, then taught economics at the university. She spent some time working as an economist for the United States Department of Labor, then became a bookkeeper, and joined the International Union of Electrical Workers (IUE). She was elected as chair of the union's women's council, and was a founder of the Coalition of Labor Union Women (CLUW). She served as treasurer of the coalition for 17 years, then in 1993 won election as its president.

In 1993, Johnson was also elected as a vice-president of the AFL-CIO, becoming the second African American woman to hold the position. In addition, she became president of the National Committee on Pay Equity, serving until 2000. That year, the IUE merged into the Communication Workers of America, of which Johnson became a vice-president. In 1999, she won the Eugene V. Debs Award. She retired from her labor union posts in 2004, and became president of the Labor Coalition for Community Action.

Trade union offices
| Preceded by Joyce D. Miller | President of the Coalition of Labor Union Women; 1993–2003 | Succeeded by Susan Phillips |
Awards
| Preceded by Howard Zinn | Winner of the Eugene V. Debs Award; 1999 | Succeeded by Michael Sullivan |
