= Edith Emerald Johns =

Winnebago-Nez Perce nurse (1915–1999)

- Patche-Ka-Danga
- 1971 as head caseworker of St. Augustine's Center for the American Indian in Chicago
- Born: Edith Big Fire Johns; January 19, 1915; Winnebago Reservation in Thurston County, Nebraska
- Died: June 10, 1999 (aged 84); Chicago, Illinois
- Other name: Edith Syfczak
- Occupations: nurse, Native American activist
- Years active: 1937-1999

Edith Emerald Johns (Winnebago name: Patche-Ka-Danga) also Edith Big Fire Johns (1915–1999) Winnebago-Nez Perce was an American nurse and community leader in the Chicago area in the mid-20th century. She was one of the founding staff of the Native American Educational Services College and was inducted into the Chicago Women's Hall of Fame and the Chicago Senior Citizens Hall of Fame.

== Early life ==
Edith Big Fire Johns was born January 19, 1915, on the Winnebago Reservation in Thurston County, Nebraska. Her father was a member of the Winnebago Tribe of Nebraska and her mother was Nez Perce. From the age of eleven, Johns attended school away from her family at an American Indian boarding school. In 1937, she completed nursing school in Ft. Wayne, Indiana, and then moved to Chicago.

== Career ==
Johns worked at several hospitals in the Chicago area, including the Bethany Hospital and the Advocate Illinois Masonic Medical Center. Johns spent a decade as a caseworker at St. Augustine's Center for the American Indian and by 1971 was the chief caseworker.

Johns was very involved in the urban Indian movement of the 1960s and 1970s, giving speeches and attending meetings. In 1968, Johns attended the National Urban Indian Consultation in Seattle, which was founded to focus on the problems of urban Native Americans, as the National Congress of American Indians was seen as too focused on reservation issues. Johns was one of the founders, along with Willard LaMere, of the Chicago American Indian Center (AIC) and served on its board of directors between 1960 and 1971. The center offered cultural programs and fellowship allowing members to share their skills. Johns was a skilled beadworker and shared her knowledge of the craft.

Johns was a founding staff member of the Native American Educational Services College (NAES). NAES was founded in 1974 to address the lack of higher education opportunities for urban Indians and Johns was hired as an instructor in 1975. She taught a course, "Dynamics of Community Health" which dealt with health care, development and patient rights. Johns worked at the college until 1978, when she left to work as the assistant nursing director of Somerset Residential Care Center.

Johns returned to college, attending the College of St. Francis in Joliet, Illinois, and earned her bachelor's degree in 1977. At the age of 65, Johns joined the Peace Corps and served as a nurse in Dominica for two years. She also traveled to Australia and New Zealand to meet with indigenous people there. In 1990, she began working at O'Hare International Airport for Travelers and Immigrants Aid and assists with infants arriving for adoption, runaways, and those in need of assistance when traveling through or immigrating through the airport.

Johns died on June 10, 1999, in Chicago and was buried in Rosehill Cemetery. She was survived by two sons, Harold Johns and David Syfczak.

== Awards and honors ==
Johns was inducted into the Chicago Women's Hall of Fame, as well as Chicago's Senior Citizens Hall of Fame.

== External Sources ==
- Guide to the Native American Educational Services Edith E. Johns Papers 1959-1999 at the University of Chicago Special Collections Research Center
