= Juliann Bluitt Foster =

American dentist (1938–2019)

Juliann Bluitt Foster DDS
- Born: Juliann Stephanie Bluitt; June 14, 1938; Washington, D.C.
- Died: April 17, 2019 (aged 80); Hilton Head, South Carolina
- Education: Howard University, BS (1958); Howard University, DDS (1962)
- Occupation: Dentist
- Employers: Northwestern University, 1967 – 2001; Chicago Board of Health, 1964 – 1967
- Organization(s): Chicago Dental Society; American College of Dentists
- Board member of: Health Care Service Corporation
- Spouse: Roscoe C. Foster Jr. (d. 2014)

Juliann Bluitt Foster (June 14, 1938 – April 17, 2019) . Bluitt was born and raised in Washington, D.C., on June 14, 1938. She was the only child to Marion Eugenia Hughes and Stephen Bernard Bluitt. In 1993, she became the first woman President of the American College of Dentists, as well as the first woman President of the Chicago Dental Society in 1992.

== Early life and education ==
Bluitt Foster grew up in segregated Washington, D.C., and attended private schools through the fourth grade when she was enrolled in public schools, graduating from Dunbar High School in 1955. Her mother, Marion Eugenia Hughes, was a first-grade teacher and her father, Stephen Bernard Bluitt Jr., worked as a government payroll clerk. Bluitt was introduced to dentistry at an early age due to her frequent visits to the orthodontist. She was a curious young black girl that wanted to learn the process of reconstructing teeth. She states "I was highly impressed with orthodontic care I received as a child. There was a wide opening between my front teeth--wide enough to fit another tooth. And I was a finger sucker for a long time. So when I saw what my parents sacrificed for me to have this work done and the end result, I was amazed."She graduated from the unique Howard University for her undergraduate studies, received her bachelor's degree in zoology in 1958. She began expanding her knowledge at Howard to pursue her doctorate of dentistry, graduating in 1962. In a 1988 Chicago Tribune interview, she stated she chose dentistry because she wanted "to do something I could believe in, to be independent, to have a challenge and to do something that was different for a woman. I liked science and working with my hands." She served on many national committees such as The National Advisory Council for Health Manpower Legislation, The Federal Drug Administration Committee and Advisory Council to the Director of the National Institutes of Health. Aside from her passion for dentistry on her free-time she enjoyed traveling the world, playing golf and spending time with her pets.

== Career ==
In 1964, after graduating from Howard University, Bluitt Foster moved to Chicago, Illinois where she began working as a dentist for the Chicago Board of Health, providing dental care to children in the South Side Englewood area. After practicing for three years, she joined the faculty at Northwestern University's dental school, where she became the director of the dental hygiene department, overseeing the training of dental hygienists.“Juliann Bluitt inspired me and countless others to pursue our dreams without limitation.” she encouraged other women that look like her to follow in her footsteps of dentistry. She became the associate dean of the Dental School in 1969. In that capacity, she began developing a program in community dentistry to increase access to dental care; the program launched in 1972 and she managed it through 1978. In 1980, she began working as a director at the Health Care Service Corporation, which is the Blue Cross/Blue Shield of Illinois. She continued working there after she retired from Northwestern University in 2001, continuing her work on securing grant funding, as well as in audit and compliance. In 2008, she retired from the Health Care Service Corporation, after 28 years.

== Leadership ==
In 1992, Bluitt Foster was elected to serve as president of the Chicago Dental Society for a one-year term, becoming the first woman to hold the position. Before becoming president, she served in a number of other leadership positions, including as director and president of the organization's Kenwood-Hyde Park branch. In 1993, she was elected to serve as president of the American College of Dentists, becoming the first woman to serve in this capacity when her term began in 1994 in the organization's 75-year history. She also served on committees as part of the American Dental Association and the American Dental Education Association.

== Awards and honors ==
- Outstanding Service Award, American Dental Association, 1983
- Inductee, Chicago Women's Hall of Fame, 1991
