= Olga Madar =

American trade unionist (1915–1996)

Olga M. Madar (May 17, 1915 – May 16, 1996) was the first woman to serve on the United Auto Workers (UAW) International Executive Board.

== Early life ==
Born in Sykesville, Pennsylvania, Madar moved to Detroit, Michigan during the Great Depression. After graduating from Northeastern High School School in 1933, Madar started her career in the auto industry in 1933 on the Chrysler assembly line. In 1938, she graduated from Eastern Michigan University (formerly Michigan Normal School) with a degree in physical education. In 1941, she joined the UAW Local 50 while working at Ford’s Willow Run bomber plant. Her brother was Elmer Madar.

== Union work ==
According to Doug Fraser, former UAW president, Madar “was a trailblazer in the struggle for equal rights,” fighting to end racial discrimination and a champion of women’s rights. In 1947, Madar led a crusade to end racial discrimination in the men and women’s bowling association. Victory came in 1952 when the white-only membership policy was removed. She was also active in organizing community recreation programs.

Madar was named to the UAW International Executive Board in 1966. She was also the first woman elected as the union’s vice president in 1970. In 1974, Madar was the force behind the creation of the Coalition of Labor Union Women (CLUW), a nonprofit organization for trade union women affiliated with AFL-CIO. The CLUW was composed largely of women who felt disempowered in their individual unions. During the organization's first convention in 1974, Madar was elected its national president.

== Environmentalism ==
In 1972, Madar said, "The chief victims of pollution are the urban poor, Blacks and workers who cannot escape their environment. Unless we join together now to stop those who pollute for profit, our cities will become ugly cesspools of poisonous pollutants.”

Trade union offices
Preceded by Organization founded	President of the Coalition of Labor Union Women; 1974–1977	Succeeded by Joyce D. Miller
