= Daniel Ivankovich =

American orthopedic surgeon and musician

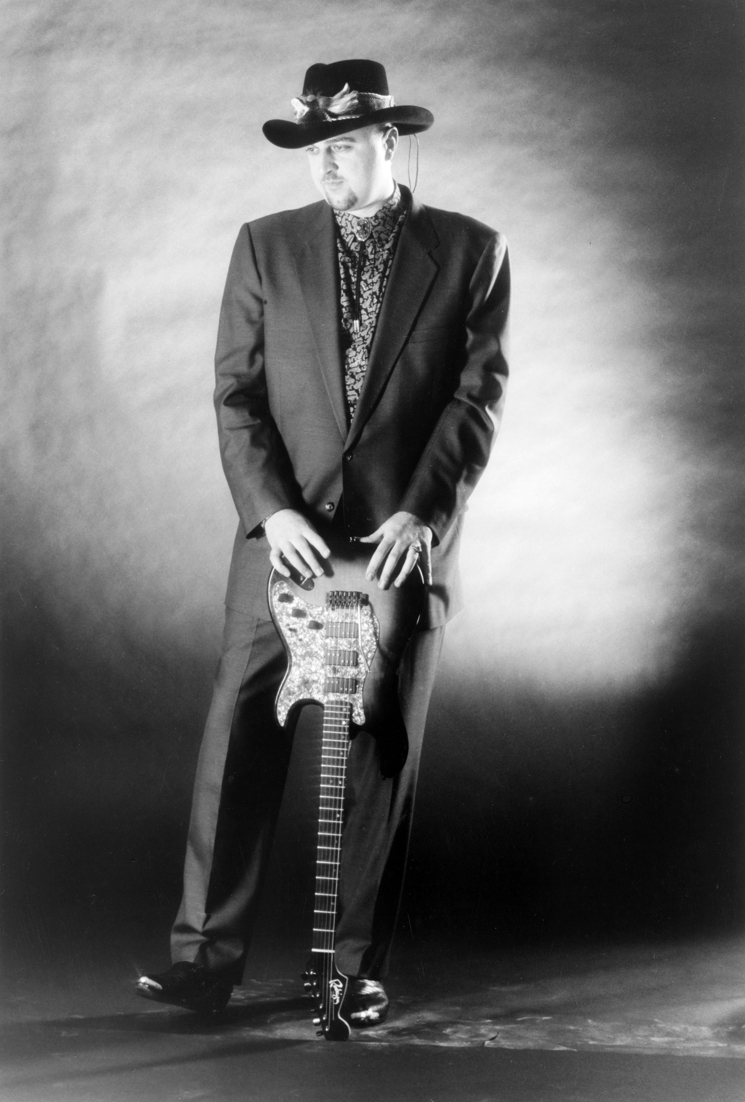
- Born: November 23, 1963 (age 62); Zagreb, Croatia
- Other names: Chicago Slim; Reverend Doctor D Dr. Dan
- Education: Glenbrook South High School; Northwestern University Honors Program in Medical Education; Northwestern University Feinberg School of Medicine
- Occupations: Orthopedic surgeon Blues musician
- Organization: OnePatient Global Health Initiative
- Notable work: Operation Spinal Cord Rescue; Haiti Earthquake Relief
- Spouse: Karla Ivankovich
- Children: 4
- Website: onepatient.org

Daniel Anthony Ivankovich (born November 23, 1963) is an American orthopedic surgeon, humanitarian and blues musician.

He is best known for his advocacy of the underserved in Chicago's inner city as leader of the Bone Squad, a group of medical professionals who treat the city's uninsured and underinsured. He is also the owner of the Preston Bradley Center, a historical site in the Uptown neighborhood of Chicago.

He is also the medical director and co-founder of OnePatient Global Health Initiative, a nonprofit foundation based in Chicago with a mission "to treat patients... who have musculoskeletal health disorders, regardless of their ability to pay."

== Early life and education ==
Ivankovich was born in Zagreb, Croatia, to immigrant physician parents. His family defected from the former Yugoslavia and movich, is an anesthesiologist, former military doctor, and chairman emeritus of the Department of Anesthesia at Rush University. His mother, Olga Ivankovich, is a primary care doctor and the clinical director of the Rush University Pain Center.

As a high school senior in 1981, Ivankovich was an All-State and All-American center for the Glenbrook South High School basketball team. During his senior year, he was invited to be a member of the Chicago Sun-Times all-area travel team. He received offers of athletic scholarships from 500 colleges, choosing to attend Northwestern University in Evanston, Illinois. In the summer of 1981, Ivankovich represented Chicago in the Boston Shootout, a streetball invitational held at Boston University's Walter Brown Arena. Midway through the tournament, he was involved in an on-court collision and ruptured the ACL in his right knee. He retired from basketball after his freshman year at Northwestern due to the injury. He had 13 surgeries to repair the knee, and later described his rehabilitation as a "very dark time", as he had been determined to make it to the NBA. During his recovery, he learned to play blues guitar, and vowed to do something positive for other people.

Ivankovich graduated from Northwestern University's six-year Honors Program in Medical Education. After undergrad, he worked in radio for six years, before enrolling in Northwestern University's Feinberg School of Medicine, where he received his Doctor of Medicine in 1995. His postgraduate training in orthopedic surgery was completed at Rush University Medical Center, John H. Stroger, Jr. Hospital of Cook County (formerly known as Cook County Hospital), and Shriner's Hospitals for Children in Chicago. Ivankovich completed additional fellowship training in adult joint reconstruction, with research emphasis on osteonecrosis and hip replacement in medically co-morbid populations. He also completed fellowship training in reconstructive spine and traumatology at Northwestern Memorial Hospital and spinal cord rehabilitation at the Rehabilitation Institute of Chicago.

== Career ==
=== Radio career ===
From 1981 to 1987, between undergrad and medical school, Ivankovich worked as a radio announcer, production engineer, and graduate advisor at WNUR-FM in Evanston. He produced several shows at the CMJ-awarded station, most notably as host (under the moniker The Right Reverend, Doctor D) of Out of the Blue, which featured Chicago blues music, live performances and interviews. The all-night show was picked up by KOST Broadcasting for syndication and ran in over 60 markets across the country from 1985 to 1987. Ivankovich later worked as an announcer and producer for WCKG, the top-rated rock music station in the Chicago market. While there, he met Stephanie Miller, who was then the station's morning host. When Miller went to New York to work mornings at WQHT, Ivankovich partnered with her and produced the Hot 97 Morning Show with Miller and Howard Hoffman. Ivankovich has subsequently appeared as a guest on Miller's talk and music shows. In 2013, he and his wife Karla Ivankovich started hosting the radio show Life & Love With Karla & Dan on WVON.

=== Medical career ===
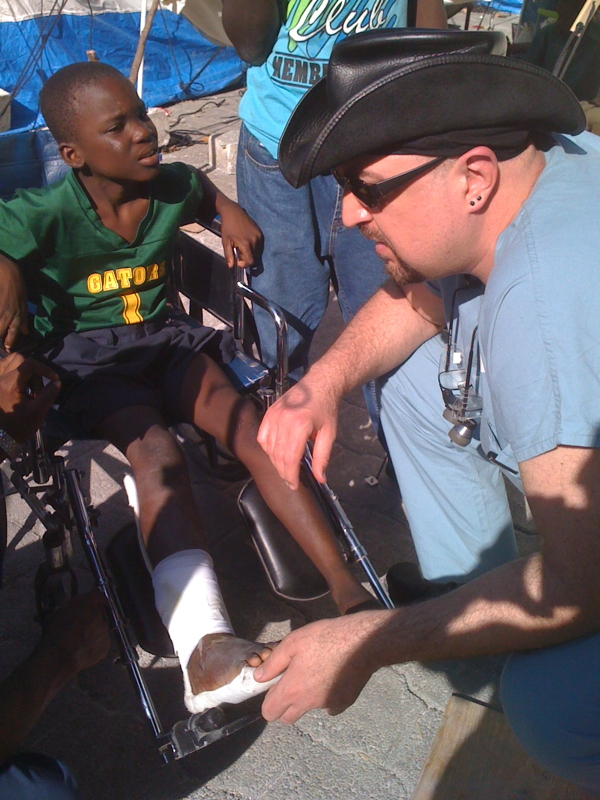
Ivankovich tending to a Haitian boy's tibia fracture in the aftermath of the 2010 earthquake

While working at Cook County Hospital and after 20 years as a doctor, Ivankovich observed patients being ignored and waiting months or even years for surgeries and had difficulty getting basic orthopedic services, while their injuries worsened. One day while treating a 48-year-old woman with knee arthritis, he realized that fixing her knees would not fix her poverty issues, and he had the idea to start a clinic that would help bring the patient "from disability to functionality." In 2009, Ivankovich and his now-wife Karla Carwile founded the Chicago-based nonprofit OnePatient Global Health Initiative, with a mission to treat patients from all over Illinois who have musculoskeletal health disorders, regardless of their ability to pay and without prejudice. The initiative has three clinics around Chicago. The full-time staffers call themselves the Bone Squad, "a consortium of surgeons, primary-care doctors, and other medical professionals who treat the city's low-income population." The name was inspired by the television show The Mod Squad (1968–73).

Ivankovich runs three OnePatient clinics in Chicago's most underserved areas. OnePatient does not turn away patients, and treats patients regardless of their ability to pay. From 2010 to 2015, OnePatient treated more than 100,000 uninsured or underinsured patients from troubled neighborhoods in Chicago, with the majority of the patients being poor, disabled and/or minorities. Ivankovich performs 600 to 800 surgical procedures per year. He has treated more than 200 victims of gun violence in Chicago. He also spends time helping aging local blues musicians navigate the healthcare system, providing many of them and their families with free care and financial assistance. On April 9, 2016, he gave a TEDx talk at Northwestern University titled Transforming Chicago: OnePatient at a Time, as part of the TEDxNorthwesternU event Beyond Boundaries.

Ivankovich also founded the Chicago Musculoskeletal Initiative, which has a goal of making healthcare for the poor population in the US a basic human right.

=== Humanitarian work ===
After the 2010 Haiti earthquake, Ivankovich and his team airlifted thousands of tons of medical supplies to the country's capital, Port-au-Prince. He collaborated with Team Rubicon USA to set up mobile forward-assist surgical teams (F.A.S.T.) to treat hundreds of Haitians with severe injuries. While making rounds through the multiple tent-city medical camps, he and colleagues from Handicap International discovered nearly 50 patients with severe spinal cord injuries. Ivankovich came upon two such patients, Bazelais Suy and Josette Delisca, who managed to survive despite life-threatening injuries. With the assistance of AirMed International and MedEvac, he escorted Suy and Delisca to Chicago, where they received care at Northwestern Memorial Hospital and the Rehabilitation Institute of Chicago. For his work in the aftermath of the Haitian earthquake, Ivankovich was named one of Chicago magazine's 2010 Chicagoans of the Year, and the National Association of Social Workers Illinois 2010 Public Citizen of the Year.

In 2010, Ivankovich was featured on CBS Evening News with Katie Couric in a segment called "The American Spirit". After his appearance on the program, Ivankovich was contacted by "Massive" Mike Williams, a retired power forward who played in the NBA for the Sacramento Kings and Atlanta Hawks. Williams had been shot eight times and paralyzed from a spinal cord injury suffered in 2009, when he tried to break up a fight while working as a security guard at an Atlanta nightclub. He recognized Ivankovich from their high school years in Chicago, when both were All-State and All-American basketball players. They hadn't spoken since 1981. Williams e-mailed Ivankovich to ask for help treating his major injuries, and Ivankovich immediately agreed to treat him. Williams subsequently regained limited use of his legs. Ivankovich and Williams partnered with Berkeley Bionics to fit Williams with eLEGS electronic prostheses.

In July 2015, Ivankovich was featured on CNN Heroes, a series spotlighting "everyday people changing the world," for his nonprofit medical work. Later that year, CNN named him one of its Top 10 CNN Heroes and awarded him a $10,000 cash prize. He was honored on CNN Heroes: An All-Star Tribute, which took place at the Museum of Natural History in New York City, with his award presented by the rapper Common. It aired as a special on CNN on December 12, 2015.

In April 2017, for his efforts in providing medical services to everyone, Ivankovich was named a "Harvey's Hero" by Steve Harvey on his Steve Harvey talk show.

=== Hospital work ===
Ivankovich is an orthopedic surgeon at multiple hospitals in Chicago, including Methodist Hospital, seeing many patients who have been victims of violent crimes.

While he was employed as an orthopedic surgeon at Provident Hospital of Cook County from 2002 to 2007, Ivankovich made public statements that were critical of proposed budget cuts at the hospital. He also supported organizing activities by a physicians' union, and criticized Cook County for spending too little on patient care and too much on administrative salaries and non-patient costs. He and two other doctors were laid off in April 2007, after budget cuts resulting in a reduction of labor. Ivankovich filed suit against the hospital for wrongful termination and alleged that the hospital had terminated his employment due to his critical statements and union activity. In 2013, Ivankovich won a wrongful termination settlement from the Cook County Health and Hospitals System, with Cook County commissioners agreeing to pay a $2.6 million settlement to Ivankovich and two other doctors.

== Music ==
=== Blues ===
Ivankovich started playing classical violin as a young child, and took up the guitar in high school. While he was in medical school at Northwestern, the director of the animal laboratories there was L.C. Thurman, who also co-owned the South Side blues club Checkerboard Lounge. Ivankovich started going there twice a week, jamming with and learning from such blues luminaries as Junior Wells, Buddy Guy and Magic Slim. He played in Otis Rush's band when he was 18, and had a stint as Rush's bandleader.

Ivankovich and his longtime musical collaborator "Killer" Ray Allison are founding members of the Chicago Blues All-Stars, and are the group's principal instrumentalists and vocalists. Ivankovich provides vocals and plays electric guitar. Ivankovich and Allison recorded an unreleased album together in the mid-1980s, while Ivankovich was on a hiatus from medical school. They founded the Chicago Blues All-Stars in 2007.

Ivankovich is known as the Right Reverend Doctor D, as well as Dr. Dan and Chicago Slim. He has played alongside many Chicago blues and rock musicians, such as Chuck Berry, James Cotton, Bo Diddley, Buddy Guy, Homesick James, Magic Slim, Hubert Sumlin, Eddie Taylor and Junior Wells. He is endorsed by Carparelli Guitars, GHS Strings and Rocktron amplifiers.

In 2013, the Chicago Blues All-Stars released the album Red, Hot & Blue on Azure Music, with Ivankovich on guitar and vocals. The band also features guitarist/vocalist Allison, singer Anji Brooks, Carl Copeland on bass, Daron Walker on drums, harmonica player Scott Dirks, keyboardist Roosevelt Purifoy, Jr., and a brass section with Johnny Cotton on trombone, Kenny Anderson on trumpet and Garrick Patton on saxophone. The band plays Chicago clubs including Buddy Guy's Legends, Kingston Mines and Rosa's.

In 2015, Ivankovich was inducted into the Chicago Blues Hall of Fame at the Master Blues Artist level. In 2016, he was emcee of the Blues Today Music, Media & Health Summit in Chicago, an event addressing financial and medical difficulties of local blues musicians.

Ivankovich is a guitar historian who specializes in guitars made in Chicago. He has spent decades amassing a collection of Chicago-built guitars from the 1930s to the 1960s, when the city was a leader in guitar making. His collection includes guitars from all the major Chicago manufacturers, including National, Supro, Harmony, Kay and Silvertone.
