= Michael Sullivan (unionist) =

Michael J. Sullivan is a former American labor union leader.

Sullivan grew up in Indianapolis, and in 1965 he started an apprenticeship as a sheet metal worker. He joined the Sheet Metal Workers' International Association, and in 1973 he began working full-time for his local union, as its business agent. In 1979, he became business manager of the local, then in 1994 he won election as general secretary of the international union.

In 1999, Sullivan was elected as general president of the union. As leader, he improved the position of the union's pension fund, and created new training opportunities for members, including an associate degree program. He was also elected as a vice-president of the AFL-CIO. He retired in 2011, becoming president of the Eugene V. Debs Foundation.

Trade union offices
| Preceded by Arthur Moore | President of the Sheet Metal Workers International Association; 1999–2011 | Succeeded by Joseph J. Nigro |
Awards
| Preceded by Gloria Tapscott Johnson | Winner of the Eugene V. Debs Award; 2000 | Succeeded by Al Chesser |
