= Kokomo Opalescent Glass Works =

Glass manufacturer in Indiana, US

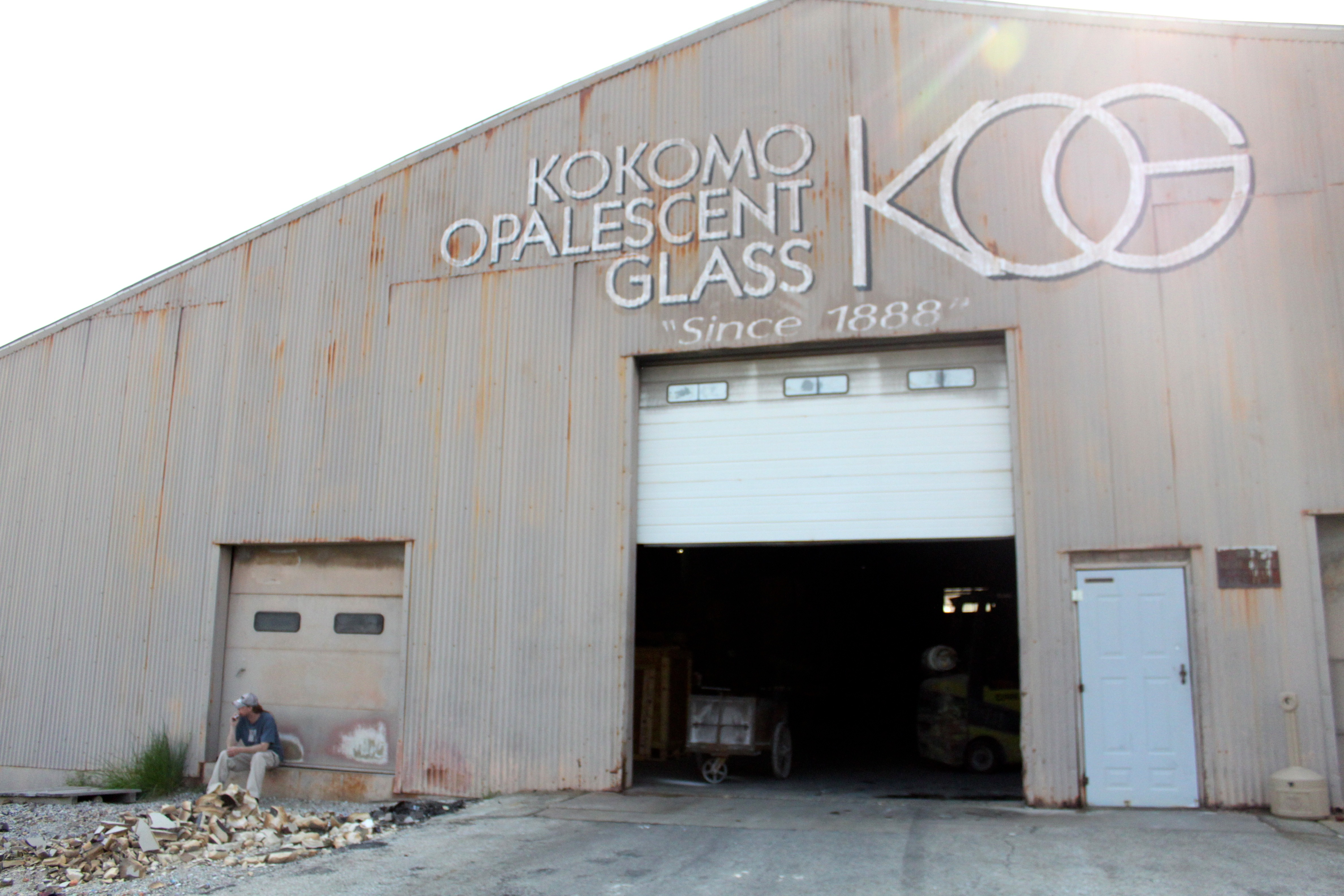
KOG factory in 2011

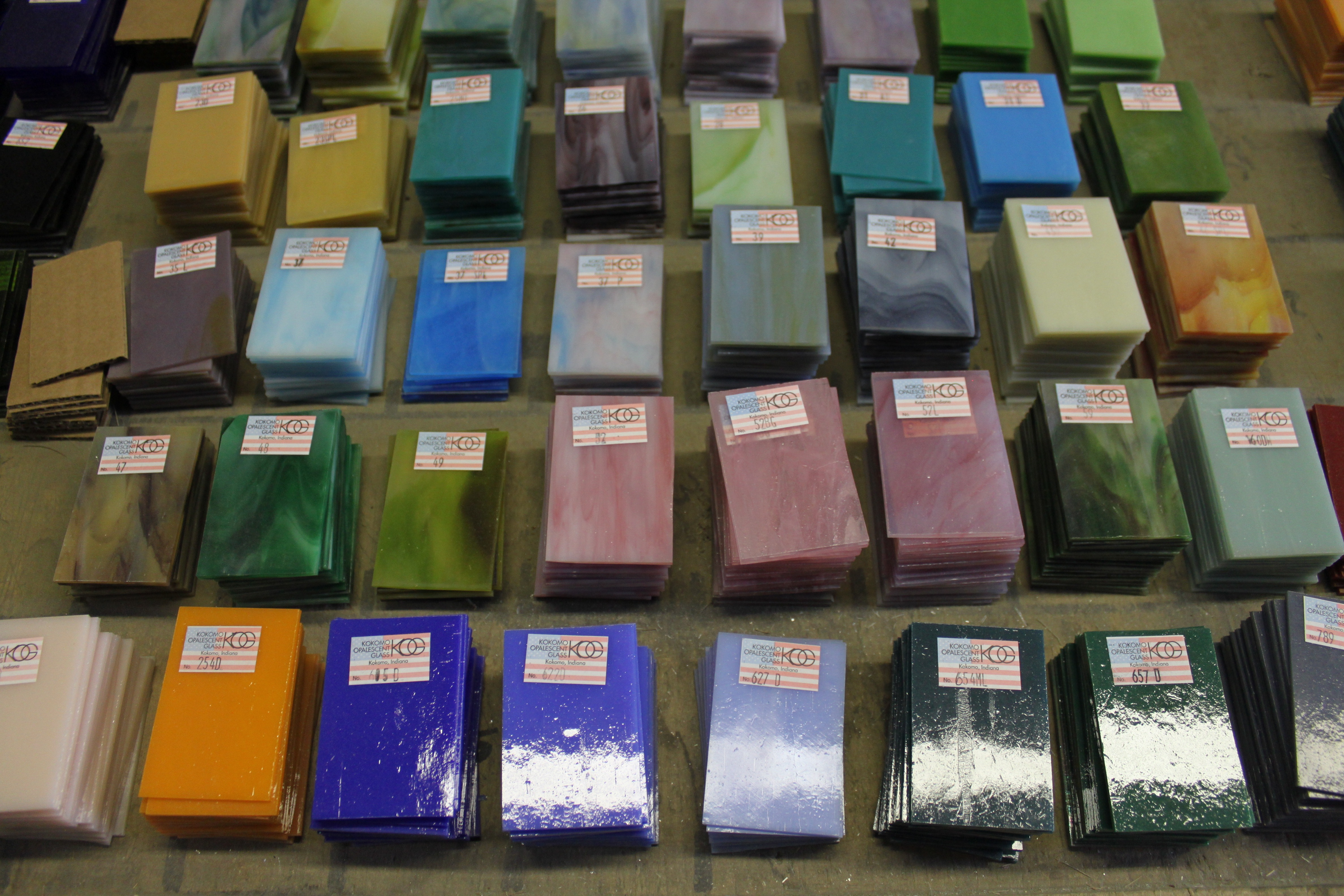
Opalescent glass samples

The Kokomo Opalescent Glass Works of Kokomo, Indiana, is the oldest manufacturer of hand cast, rolled cathedral and opalescent glass in America, and the oldest manufacturer of opalescent glass in the world. In continuous operation since 1888, it was founded by Charles Edward Henry (born Paris, France about 1846), who was relocating his existing stained glass manufacturing business from New Rochelle, New York. KOG has long been an important supplier to the American stained glass industry, including documented sales to Louis Comfort Tiffany, and in 1889, KOG won a gold medal at the Paris World Exposition for their multi-colored window glass. Among the important buildings fitted with glass from the manufacturer is the Chicago Public Library's Central Library's Book Delivery Room, which is now the Preston Bradley Hall of the Chicago Cultural Center.

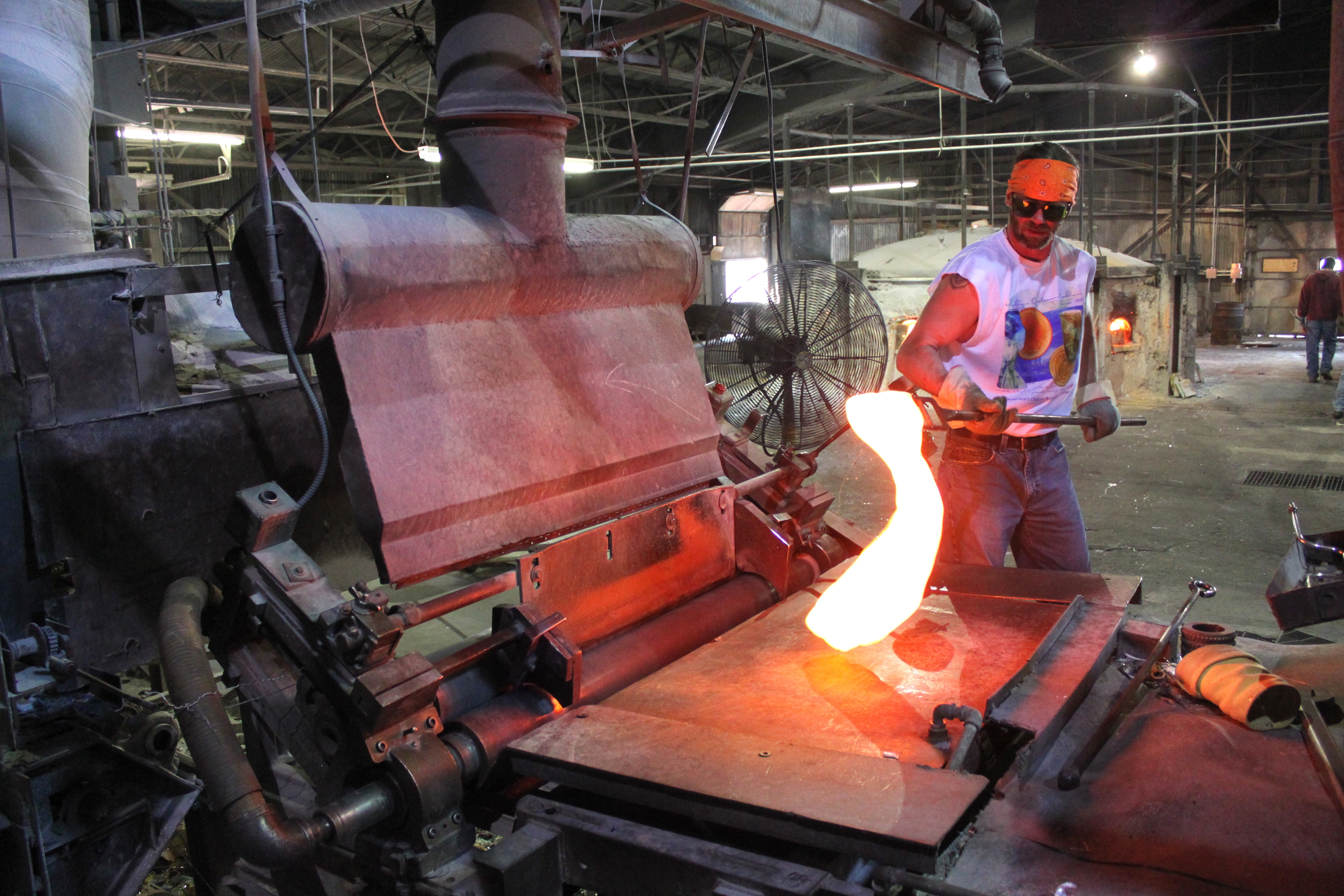
Making rolled plate glass in 2011

KOG was a leader in the development of opalescent glass from its origins, and has hundreds of color recipes, documented color combinations, and numerous textures and density formulas in sheet glass. Variation is one of the hallmarks of the way the glass is made, still using equipment for the hand-mixed roller table process that was first installed in the early 1900s.

== See also ==
- Louis Comfort Tiffany
- Stained glass
