= Clayola Brown =

American labor unionist

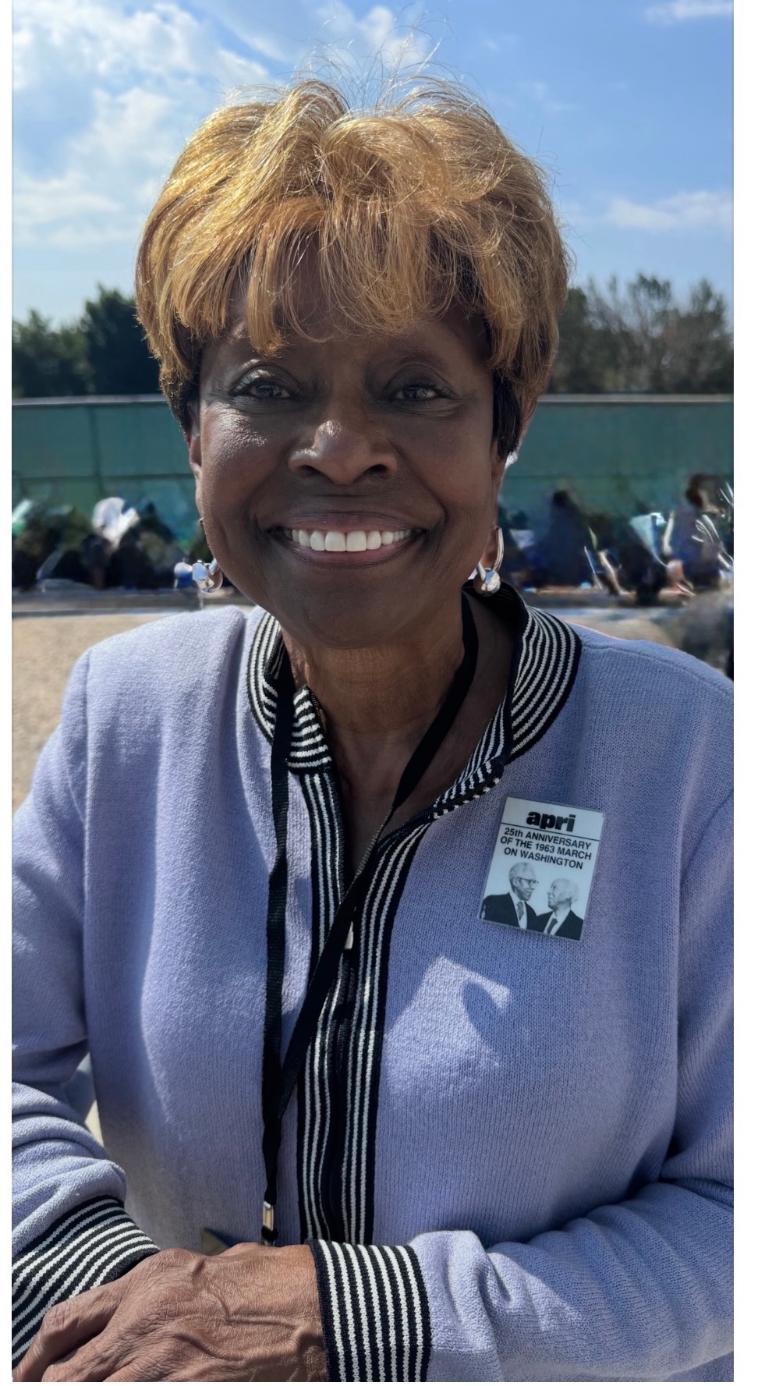
- Brown in 2026.
- Born: 4 August 1948 (age 78); Charleston, South Carolina, U.S.
- Education: Florida A&M University (BS)
- Known for: President of the A. Philip Randolph Institute (APRI), Education director of the Amalgamated Clothing Workers of America (ACWA)
- Spouse: Alfred Brown
- Children: Alfred Jr
- Awards: Eugene V. Debs Award

Clayola Brown (born Clayola Beatrice Oliver; 1948) is an African-American labor unionist, civil rights activist and International President of the APRI since August 2004. She is the first woman to take on this role. Brown also held positions as First International Vice President of the executive committee of the Workers' Defense Federation and the Coalition of Black Trade Unions (CBTU). She was conferred with the Keeper of Flame Awards, NAACP Leadership, the CBTU Woman Valor Award and Eugene V. Debs Award for her contribution to labor movements.

== Early life and education ==
Born August 4, 1948, in Charleston, South Carolina, Brown attended Simon Graz High School in Philadelphia in 1966. At 15, Brown worked alongside her mother, Ann Belle Jenkins Shands, in a movement to unionize the Manhattan Shirt Factory in Charleston, South Carolina. She earned her bachelor's degree from Florida A&M University in 1970, majoring in physical education and secondary education.

== Career ==
After graduation, Brown worked with TWUA in their claims department in Opelika, Alabama. She was instrumental in bringing together textile conglomerate JP Stevens, which in 1980 led 4,000 workers contracted through the newly formed ACTWU. She served there as civil rights director, education director and as manager of their Laundry Division. In 1991, she was elected as the Vice President of the ACTWU; holding the post for over a decade. In 1994, she was appointed to the National Committee on Employment Policy by President Bill Clinton. In 1995, Brown helped to form the Union of Needle Trades, Industrial and Textile Employees by merging the International Ladies Garment Workers Union (ILGWU) with the ACTWU. She served in key leadership positions with the Board of the Congressional Black Caucus Foundation, United Nations Advisory Council, Executive Committee for the Workers Defense League and the Sidney Hillman Foundation. She attended American University and York University in New York City for her post graduate studies. She teaches at Cornell University and consults with Trinity College on African American issues.
