= Chicago Blues All-Stars =

American blues band

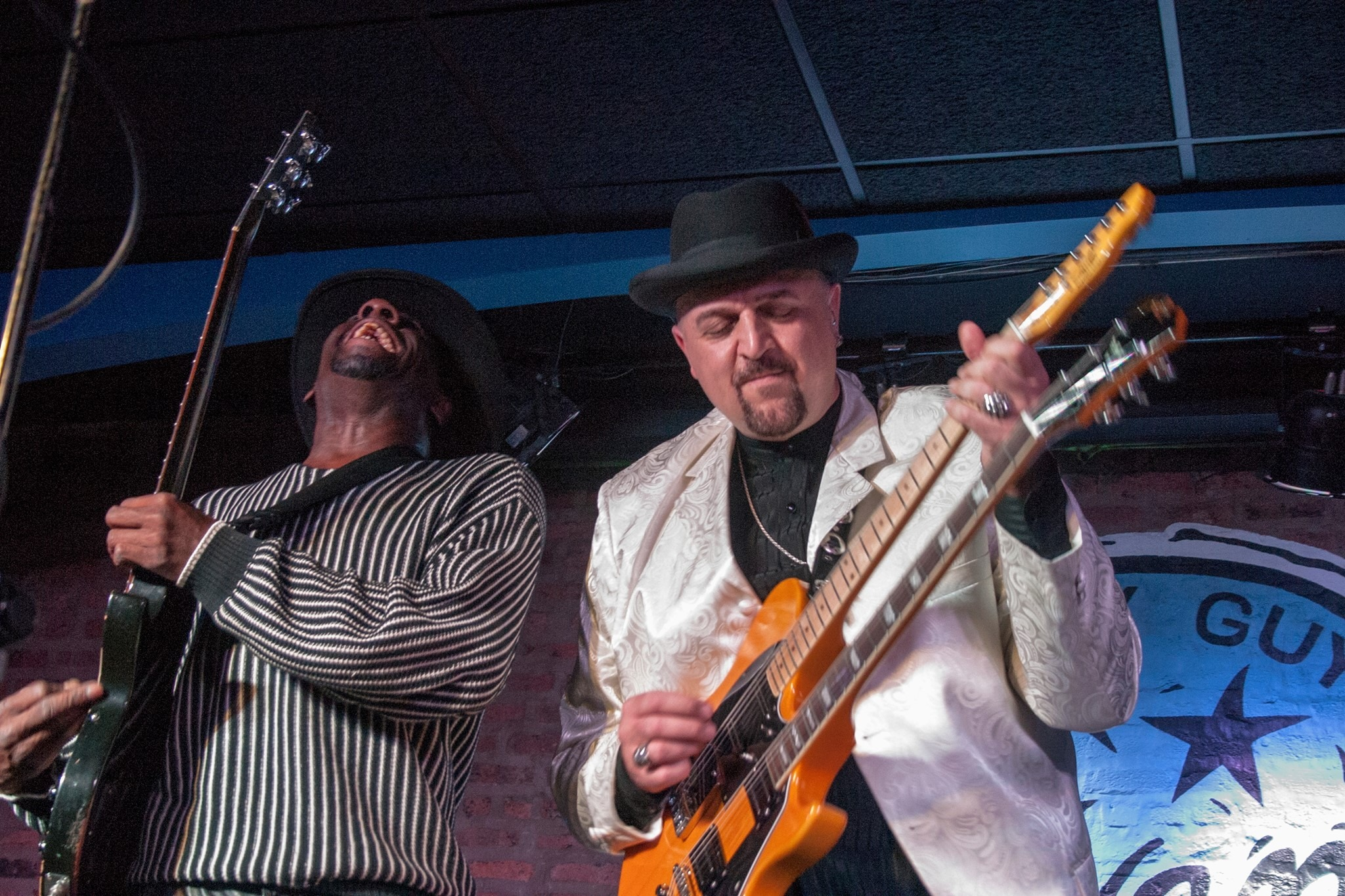

Background information
- Origin: Chicago, Illinois, United States
- Genres: Blues; Funk; Electronica
- Years active: 2007–present
- Label: Azure Music
- Members: Daniel Ivankovich; Anji Brooks; Carl Copeland; Daron Walker; Kenny Anderson; Johnny Cotton; Garrick Patten
- Past members: Ray Allison: Jerry Porter; Roosevelt Purifoy Jr.; Johnny B. Gayden; Scott Dirks
- Website: www.chicagobluesallstars.com

Chicago Blues All-Stars is an American blues band based in Chicago that incorporates elements of funk, soul, R&B and hip hop. Chicago Blues All-Stars is made up of musicians that have been together as friends and musicians for four decades. The band includes numerous inductees in the Chicago Blues Hall of Fame and has been a headliner for shows such as Buddy Guy's Legends featured on PBS and at music venues Kingston Mines and House Of Blues. "Killer" Ray Allison, a W.C. Handy Award winner, and Daniel "Chicago Slim" Ivankovich, who has played with Bo Diddley, Otis Rush and Buddy Guy, are the band leaders, co-founders, and Blues Hall of Fame inductees. Chicago Blues All-Stars have recorded with and performed with Chuck Berry, Paul Butterfield, Eric Clapton, Joe Cocker, James Cotton, Buddy Guy, Junior Wells, John Lee Hooker, Howlin’ Wolf, Albert King, B.B. King, Magic Sam, Gary Moore, Ohio Players, The Rolling Stones, Otis Rush, Koko Taylor, Big Mama Thornton, Muddy Waters and Johnny Winter.

Chicago Blues All-Stars has also performed in festivals such as the "Rockin' For The Troops" concert, an event held in Chicago to support service men and women in the military and the Fifteenth Annual Fountain Blues Festival.

== History ==
Ray Allison, a featured performer in Muddy Waters and The Rolling Stones Live at the Checkerboard Lounge, Chicago 1981, and Daniel Ivankovich, an orthopedic surgeon who once was musical director for Otis Rush, met at the ChicagoFest Blues stage on Navy Pier in the 1980s. In 2007, Allison and Ivankovich formed the Chicago Blues All-Stars to create a new millennium version of their sound. They wanted to create a music revue that people unfamiliar with blues music could experience and get excited about. Additionally, they wanted to reach a younger audience that was interested in a variety of music but to catch their attention with blues.

Allison died in 2016, aged 60.

== Reception ==
Chicago Blues All-Stars has received radio play on over 200 stations in 22 countries. Since the album's release in December 2013, the band has remained at the top of ReverbNation's Chicago and US Blues charts. Red, Hot & Blue broke Top 25 on Living Blues Radio Report, as well as reached Top 30 on the Roots Music Report. The album has been listed as number 35 on AirPlay Direct's All Time Top 50 APD Blues/Jazz/Reggae Albums.

== Members ==
- "Killer" Ray Allison - Guitar, vocals (June 20, 1956 – October 6, 2016)
- Chicago Slim (Daniel Ivankovich) - Guitar, vocals
- Anji Brooks - Vocals
- Carl Copeland – Bass
- Scott Dirks - Harmonica
- Roosevelt Purifoy Jr - Keyboards, Organ
- Daron Walker – Drums
- Kenny Anderson - Trumpet
- Johnny Cotton – Trombone
- Garrick Patten - Saxophone

== Discography ==
Album	Artist	Year	Label	Number	Notes
Red, Hot, & Blue	Chicago Blues All-Stars	2013	Azure	1001	Features "Killer" Ray Allison, Chicago Slim, Anji Brooks & All-Star Horns
The Definitive Buddy Guy	Buddy Guy	2009	Shout! Factory	11303	Features Ray "Killer" Allison As Session Musician
Buddy's Baddest: The Best Of Buddy Guy	Buddy Guy	1999	Sony/BMG	653582	Features Ray "Killer" Allison As Session Musician
Hound Dog Taylor: A Tribute	Various Artists	1998	Alligator	514855	Features Ray "Killer" Allison As Session Musician
Force Of Nature	Koko Taylor	1993	Alligator	514817	Features Ray "Killer" Allison As Session Musician
Living In The Danger Zone	Son Seals	1991	Alligator	514798	Features Ray "Killer" Allison As Session Musician
Harp Attack!	James Cotton	1990	Alligator	514790	Features Ray "Killer" Allison As Session Musician
Live On WXRT	Otis Rush	1984	WXRT	Archives	Features Daniel Ivankovich (Chicago Slim) As Session Musician
Stone Crazy	Buddy Guy	1981	Alligator	514723	Features Ray "Killer" Allison As Session Musician
Checkerboard Lounge: Live In Chicago 1981	Muddy Waters With The Rolling Stones	1981	Eagle	30553	Features Ray "Killer" Allison As Session Musician
