= Chicago Women's Hall of Fame =

The Chicago Women's Hall of Fame was created in 1988 by the Chicago Commission on Women to recognize the endeavors of women to improve their socio-economic and political quality of life in the City of Chicago, United States. The awards were distributed each August and photographs and biographies of the inductees were placed in City Hall to inspire others to aim for excellence. August was chosen to commemorate the passage of the 19th Amendment, which occurred on August 26, 1920.

Chicago Women's Hall of Fame Inductees
Name	Image	Birth–Death	Year	Area of achievement
Jane Addams		(1860–1935)	1988	Social Reform
Phyllis L. Apelbaum		(1940–)	1989	Business
Juliann Bluitt		(1938–2019)	1991	Health
Abena Joan Brown		(1928–2015)	1991	Arts
Minnie Lightfoot Bruce		(1912–2008)	1990	Religion
Margaret Burroughs		(1915–2010)	1989	
Audrey L. Davis			1988	
Dr. Effie Ellis		(1913–1994)	1989	
Dixie B. Fortis		(1933–2013)		Business
Maria Garay			1989	Education
Irene C. Hernandez		(1915–1997)	1989	Government
Caroline Herzenberg		(1932–2025)	1989	
Bella Itkin		(1920–2011)	1990	Arts and literature
Edith Emerald Johns		(1915–1999)		Nursing/Native American advocacy
Judith Spinner Johns		(1944–)	1990	Health
Gwendolyn Dubose Laroche			1990	Education
Veronica Lucas			1989	Civic development
Grace Lunde		(1913–2005)	1989	Communications
Leona Maglaya		(1948–)	1989	Social Services
Peggy A. Montes		(1936–)	1989	Women's Rights Advocacy
Janet Norfleet		(1933–)	1990	Government
San Luong O		(1950–)	1990	Social services
Virginia Ojeda		(1947–)	1990	Business
Mary Pullins		(1901–2010)		Labor
Monica Reynolds		(1920–1998)	1990	Law
Esther Rothstein		(1913–1998)	1989	Law
Florence Scala		(1918–2007)	1990	Civic
Helen Schubert		(1930–2023)	1990	Communications / Media
Bobbie L. Steele		(1937–)	1993	
Joyce Tucker		(1948–)	1990	Women's rights
Muriel Tuteur		(1922–2016)	1989	Labor
Ida B. Wells		(1862–1931)	1988	African-American activist.
Mollie West		(1916–2015)	1990	Labor
Jo Ann Williams			1990	Military
