= Clara Day =

American trade unionist (1923–2015)

- Clara Day in 1964
- Born: August 29, 1923; Tuscaloosa, Alabama, US
- Died: 1 February 2015 (aged 91)

Clara Day (August 29, 1923 – February 1, 2015) was an American trade unionist and civil rights activist. She was a member of the International Brotherhood of Teamsters.

== Biography ==
Day was born to a family of farmers in Tuscaloosa, Alabama in 1923. Her family was large and included her 10 siblings and her aunts, uncles, and many cousins who lived and worked on adjacent farmland. She married her husband, Joseph Day, when she was 17 years old, and they had a daughter the following year. Her husband was briefly in the military before being discharged due to severe hearing loss.

Like many Black families during the Second Great Migration, Day decided to move to Chicago with her husband and daughter for better economic opportunities. They also had a support system of friends and family who had already made the journey.

Clara Day (center) meets with other labor leaders in 1963

In 1955, Day started working at a local Teamster branch in Chicago: Warehouse and Mail Order Employees Union Local 743. In 1974, she was a founding member of the Coalition of Labor Union Women (CLUW). That same year, she was elected to the executive board of Local 743. She also served as Trustee and Recording Secretary for the union.

Day was a committed civil rights activist and liaised with the local NAACP. In addition to her social justice work for the union, she led a delegation of Teamster Local 743 in the March on Washington in 1963.
