= Esther Rothstein =

American lawyer (1913–1998)

Esther Ruth Rothstein (1913– December 2, 1998) was an American lawyer. Upon graduating from the Chicago-Kent College of Law, she became a founding member and president of the Women’ Bar Association Foundation, the first female president of the Chicago Bar Association and the first female director of the Illinois Bell Telephone Company branch.

== Early life and education ==
Rothstein was born in Milwaukee, Wisconsin in 1913 to parents Adolph Rothstein and Frieda Zucker Rothstein. She attended Marquette University for her Bachelor of Arts degree and earned a position as a legal secretary for several years before deciding to enrol in law school. With the approval and encouragement of the partners at McCarthy and Levin, she attended the Chicago-Kent College of Law at night while continuing to work as a secretary. She graduated as one of two women in her class and gained admission to the bar in 1950. She continued working at her old law firm and was named a partner at McCarthy and Levin in 1955.

== Career ==
Rothstein began to stem out of McCarthy and Levin in the 1960s, becoming a founding member and president of the Women's Bar Association of Illinois in 1961. She later played a role as Chairman of the Women's Bar Foundation's Bartelme Committee which was in charge of awarding scholarships to women law students. A few years later, Rothstein was elected secretary of the advisory board of her alma mater, Chicago-Kent College of Law. As a result of her legal experience, Rothstein became the first female elected president of the Chicago Bar Association, which she served for one year after working as vice president. She chose to leave her position in 1978 to become the first female director of the Bell Telephone Company's board because "women have made great strides in the professions, but they have largely been neglected by boards of major corporations." It would not be until 14 years later when another female would be elected president of the Chicago Bar Association. From 1985 until 1987, she returned to the Chicago Bar to serve as president of the Chicago Bar Foundation while also co-founding and presiding over the Women's Bar Association of Illinois Foundation. After earning an induction into the Chicago Women's Hall of Fame, Rothstein became president of the Illinois Humane Society.

As a result of her activism and legal work, Rothstein received numerous awards including the ABA's Margaret Brent Women Lawyers of Achievement Award, the Chicago Legal Services Foundation Distinguished Service Award and Laureate Award from the Illinois State Bar association. Rothstein died on December 2, 1998, in her home in Chicago.
