= Sandra Delgado =

American dramatist

Sandra Delgado is a Colombian-American actor, writer, and producer who grew up and works in Chicago, Illinois. She is best known for her work La Havana Madrid, an acclaimed play based in the 1960s about a Chicago nightclub of the same name and the Latino community in Chicago's Lakeview neighborhood.

== Acting ==
Delgado's Chicago acting credits include 2666 (The Goodman Theatre), The Motherfucker with the Hat (Steppenwolf Theatre Company) and Mojada (Victory Gardens Theater), named one of the top ten performances of 2013 by Chicago Tribune. Television credits include Law & Order: SVU, Chicago Justice, Empire, The Exorcist, Chicago Fire and Mind Games. Delgado is a member of SAG/AFTRA and the Actors' Equity Association.

== Writing ==
Delgado's most notable written work is La Havana Madrid, a play with live music depicting the former Chicago Spanish-music nightclub of the same name. The play which had three sold-out productions, at Steppenwolf Theatre Company and the Goodman Theatre produced by Teatro Vista in 2017, and a co-production in 2019 by Collaboraction and Teatro Vista.

Her storytelling series, Saints and Sinners, debuted at Collaboraction and continued at Steppenwolf in the spring of 2017. Her play Felons and Familias, tells the story of a woman caught in the black hole of criminal immigration courts, and was featured in Chicago's Theater On The Lake's inaugural 2018 'In The Works' season, followed by a run at the Goodman Theatre.

== Artistic leadership ==
Delgado produced Teatro Vista's and Collaboraction's Yo Solo Festival of Latino Solo Shows and Collaboraction's Sketchbook Festival from 2005 to 2008. She is a founding ensemble member of Collaboraction and an ensemble member of Teatro Vista (associate artistic director from 2006 to 2008). She is the recipient of the Joyce Award, the Theater Communications Group (TCG) Fox Foundation Resident Actor Fellowship, is a two-time Chicago Department of Cultural Affairs and Special Events grantee and a 3Arts 3AP Project grantee. Delgado is a TCG Young Leader of Color alum, a current member of ALTA Chicago’s Semillero Playwright's Circle and is on the Advisory Committee of the Latinx Theatre Commons, a national advocacy group for Latinx theater artists.

Sandra Delgado is one of the 20 women featured in Kerry James Marshall's RUSH MORE mural on the Chicago Cultural Center.
