= Addie L. Wyatt =

American labor leader (1924–2012)

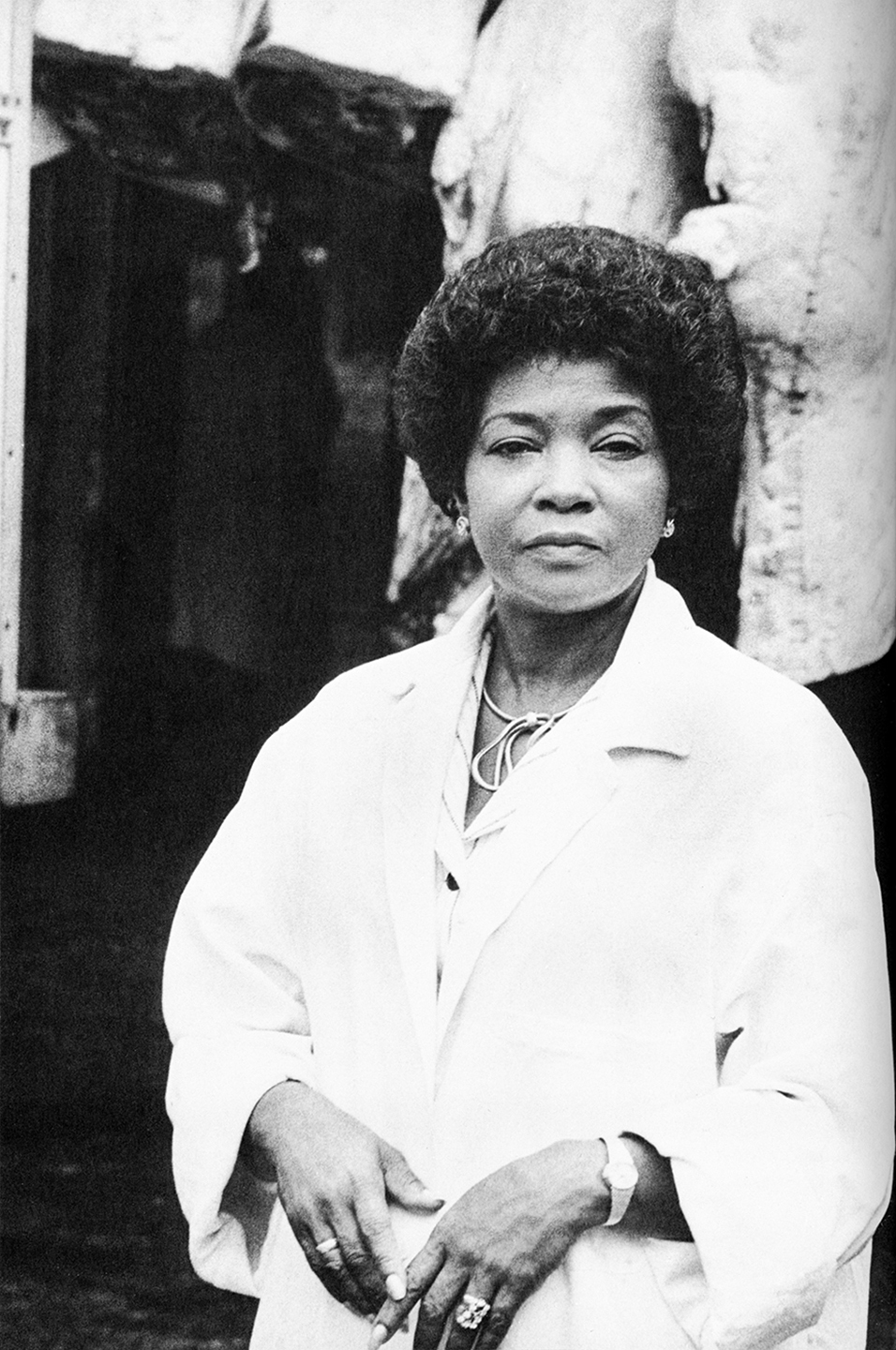
- Addie Wyatt photographed by Lynn Gilbert
- Born: Addie L. Cameron; March 8, 1924; Brookhaven, Mississippi, U.S.
- Died: March 28, 2012 (aged 88); Chicago, Illinois, U.S.
- Occupations: Labor leader, civil rights pioneer, pastor
- Spouse: Claude S. Wyatt Jr.
- Children: Renaldo Wyatt; Claude S. Wyatt III
- Parent(s): Ambrose Cameron; Maggie Nolan Cameron

Addie L. Wyatt (née Cameron; March 8, 1924 – March 28, 2012) was a leader in the United States Labor movement and a civil rights activist. Wyatt is known for being the first African-American woman elected international vice president of a major labor union, the Amalgamated Meat Cutters Union. Wyatt began her career in the union in the early 1950s and advanced in leadership. In 1975, with the politician Barbara Jordan, she was the first African-American woman named by Time magazine as Person of the Year.

== Family and early life ==
Wyatt was born to Ambrose and Maggie (Nolan) Cameron in Brookhaven, Mississippi, on March 8, 1924. She was the second child and the oldest daughter of eight children. She moved with her family to Chicago in 1930 when she was six years old. The family relocated in hopes of finding better job opportunities during the Great Depression. However, obtainable jobs for African Americans at this time were hard to come by.

At 16 years old, she married Claude S. Wyatt, a postal finance clerk, on May 12, 1940. With Claude she had two sons, Renaldo Wyatt and Claude S. Wyatt III. She raised several of her younger siblings after her mother died at the age of 39 and her father was unable to care for them because of illness.

== Meatpacking industry and union work ==
After her marriage, Wyatt applied for a job as a typist for Armour and Company in 1941. On her first day of work, she discovered African American women were not hired as typists in the front office and instead was sent to the canning department to pack stew in cans for the army. In the early 1950s, Wyatt joined the United Packinghouse Workers of America upon discovering the union did not discriminate against its members. As the forefront leader of black women within unions, she and others took advantage of their union's antiracist and antidiscrimination bylaws and fought race-based and gender-based inequities at work as well as in their communities. In 1955, Wyatt worked full-time on staff for the UPWA, representing workers across a five-state region. She recognized the importance and effectiveness of interracial organization. Among other achievements, Wyatt and her union of black, white, and Latino laborers were able to win "equal pay for equal work" provisions in many union contracts well before the passing of the Equal Pay Act of 1963.

In 1953, Wyatt was "elected vice president of her branch, Local 56, becoming the first black woman to hold senior office in an American labor union." Wyatt was the director of the Women's Affairs and Human Rights departments of the Amalgamated Meat Cutters. By 1956, Wyatt was the Program Coordinator for District One of the UPWA. This was also the year the Wyatts began their work with Dr. Martin Luther King Jr, with whom they helped raise funds for the Montgomery Improvement Association. In the early 1960s, Eleanor Roosevelt recognized her leadership abilities and appointed her to a position on the Labor Legislation Committee of the United States Commission on the Status of Women. African American women, with Addie Wyatt at the helm, had the unparalleled experience of working on the floors of the meatpacking plants as well as being integral parts of building the unions.

During the 1970s she became a powerful figure in the United Food and Commercial Workers International Union. During this time, she worked harder to create unions that were more inclusive of minorities. In 1972, she became the founding member of the Coalition of Black Trade Unionists, which was formed to ensure that black workers could "share in the power of the labor movement at every level." As chair of CBTU's National Women's Committee, Wyatt helped ensure that AFL-CIO-affiliated unions opened leadership positions to women. This not only led African Americans to great confidence within the labor force, but also to women in general becoming financially independent and effective contributors of the economy.

In 1974, Wyatt co-founded the Coalition of Labor Union Women in order to create a stronger, more effective voice for women in the labor movement. When Wyatt became the international vice president of the United Food and Commercial Workers in 1976 she was the first African-American woman to take a high-level leadership position in an international union. She fought for human rights on three fronts; as a laborer, as a woman, and as an African American.

== Ministry and civil rights work ==
In 1955, Wyatt was ordained as a Church of God minister. Together with her husband, also an ordained Church of God minister, she worked in the ministry and civil rights campaign of Dr. Martin Luther King Jr. and participated in major civil rights marches, including the March on Washington, and the march from Selma to Montgomery, Alabama. Wyatt was involved in grassroots civil rights work in Chicago and participated in organizing protests.

She was a labor adviser to the Southern Christian Leadership Conference (SCLC). She served on the Action Committee of the Chicago Freedom Movement. In the 1960s, Wyatt was active in Operation Breadbasket, which distributed food to underprivileged people across the United States.

In 1955, the Wyatts founded the Vernon Park Church of God (Anderson, Indiana) in Chicago. The church began in a small, oil stained floor, house garage (located at 90th Vernon in Chicago) with a congregation made up only of the Wyatts' children, siblings and a few close faithful friends. In 1984, Wyatt became a full-time minister, and was appointed by her husband to serve as Co-Pastor of the church, working faithfully alongside him. The couple's ministry together spanned 44 years, during which time the Wyatts' church matriculated from the small house garage, to a storefront above a furniture store on 74th Cottage Grove (Chicago), from there on to their first church built from the ground at 7653 S. Maryland Avenue (Chicago), and then finally on to their second church built from the ground located at 9011 S. Stony Island Avenue (Chicago), which included a 1000-seat Sanctuary edifice with classrooms and an industrial sized kitchen. It was at this location that the Wyatts pastored faithfully until illness overtook their bodies, causing them to retire from pastoring in 2000. Although retired from pastoring, the Wyatts continued to faithfully attend and serve within their church worship services until their deaths. In 1999, Wyatt was the founder and CEO of the Wyatt Family Community Center in Chicago, the church's multipurpose community center which served the community and the nation through its diverse programming for families.

Wyatt was a founding member of the National Organization for Women.

Wyatt was a co-founded of the Coalition of Labor Union Women with Willa Mae Sudduth in 1974.

== Honors ==
Wyatt was named one of Time magazine's Women of the Year in 1975. The publication recognized her for "speaking out effectively against sexual and racial discrimination in hiring, promotion and pay." Wyatt's picture appeared on the magazine's cover along with First Lady Betty Ford, tennis great Billie Jean King, and Rep. Barbara Jordan, one of the first black women elected to Congress. She was inducted as an Honorary member of Delta Sigma Theta sorority in 1983.

From 1980 to 1984 she was one of Ebony magazine's 100 most influential black Americans.

In 1987, the Coalition of Black Trade Unionists established the Addie L. Wyatt Award.

Addie L. Wyatt was inducted as a Laureate of The Lincoln Academy of Illinois and awarded the Order of Lincoln (the State's highest honor) by the Governor of Illinois in 2003 in the area of Religion and Labor.

== See also ==
- List of African-American firsts
- Labor Hall of Honor
