= Abena Joan Brown =

Theatre director

- 1995 Black Theatre Alliance Award Ceremony
- Born: Abena Joan Phillips; May 8, 1928; Chicago, Illinois
- Died: July 12, 2015 (aged 87); Chicago, Illinois
- Other names: Abena Brown, Abena Joan P. Brown
- Occupation: Arts patron
- Years active: 1960-2011
- Known for: Founding the Creative Arts Foundation of Chicago

Abena Joan Brown (1928-2015) was an African-American businesswoman and theater producer who founded the Creative Arts Foundation in Chicago to enable black artists to work. Known as the "mother of Chicago's black arts community", she received honors and awards for her work in both theater and social programs. Brown was inducted into the Chicago Women's Hall of Fame and interviewed as a subject of the archival program The HistoryMakers.

== Early life ==
Abena Joan Phillips was born on May 8, 1928 in Chicago, as the only child of Lueola Reed. She began studying dance when she was three years old and performed in church from childhood. After she was discovered skipping school, Phillips was sent to a Catholic boarding school by her mother. She began her tertiary education as a dance major at the University of Illinois and completed her bachelor's degree at Roosevelt University. She then went on to complete a master's degree in social work at the University of Chicago, after challenging the university to open its doors to black students.

== Career ==
Brown began her career as a social worker and became the Program Services Director at the Harriett M. Harris YWCA of Metropolitan Chicago. She was actively involved in the creation of such organizations as National Association of Black Social Workers during the Civil Rights Movement. Brown's vision was unapologetically Afrocentric and she was driven to create organizations that featured and nurtured the black community. In 1969, Brown and Okoro Harold Johnson, who had met while they were students at Roosevelt University came up with the idea of creating a talent organization for black actors. Together, they along with Al Johnson and Archie Weston Sr. created Ebony Talent Agency (ETA), as an agency to discover and place performers. ETA was franchised by both the American Federation of Television and Radio Artists and the Screen Actors Guild and later evolved into the Creative Arts Foundation, offering training and theater performance opportunities. In 1982, she quit her position at the YWCA to focus her energies full-time to the creation of ETA.

After several years without a permanent home, the group found a permanent location in an abandoned factory in 1978 and began renovations of the space. Over the next decade, with numerous fundraising events, including a National Endowment for the Arts grant, the group staged performances and completed the additions of office and classroom space, a gallery, a library, and a 200-seat modern theater in South Chicago. Brown served as CEO of the organization and continuously worked to expand the organization, spearheading the purchase of additional land in 1995 and again in 1998 to improve both the courses they could offer, as well as showcase works written and performed by black artists. She also pushed efforts to create a children's theater, summer camps and training to inspire children to become involved in the arts.

In addition to her work at ETA, Brown spoke at many events advocating for the arts in and around Chicago. She retired in 2011 after 40 years at ETA. Brown died on July 12, 2015, in Chicago.

== Legacy ==
Brown, who was called by the Chicago Sun-Times, the "mother of Chicago's black arts community" was inducted into the Chicago Women's Hall of Fame in 1991 and in 1995 received a Lifetime Achievement Award from the Black Theater Alliance of Chicago. She received the Governor's Award for the Arts, African American Arts Alliance's Paul Robeson Award, as well as many honors from local organizations. Regionally, she received the Hazel Joan Bryant Award from the Midwest African-American Theatre Alliance and was nationally recognized in 2001 as an interviewee for the black history archive project known as The HistoryMakers. In 2011, a section of South Chicago Avenue, between 75th and 76th Streets, was renamed in her honor.
