= Preston Bradley =

American clergyman, writer and academic

Preston Bradley (August 18, 1888– June 1, 1983) was an American clergyman, author, and lecturer. As a follower of the liberal Henry George, he addressed social justice, poverty, and civic matters in his preaching. He was the founder and pastor of the Peoples Church in the Uptown Neighborhood of Chicago.

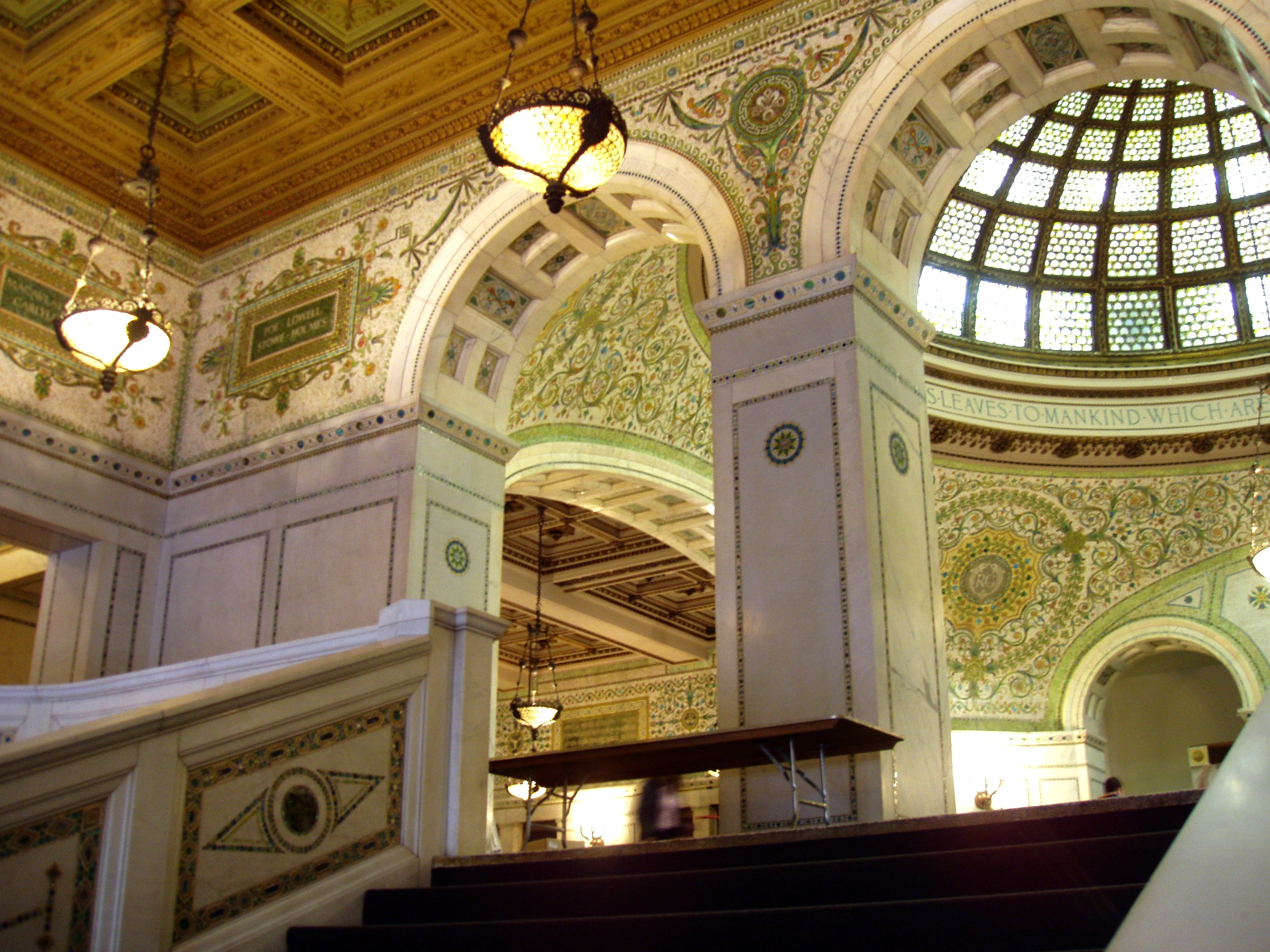
Chicago Cultural Center - Grand Staircase and Preston Bradley Hall

== Early life and religious affiliations ==
Bradley was born and raised in Linden, Michigan, in a conservative Christian home. He attended Alma College and a Flint, Michigan law school. He worked as a weekend pastor while a student. In 1911, he moved to Chicago to attend the conservative Moody Bible Institute. After being ordained as a Presbyterian minister in 1912, he left the church saying, "I am not orthodox about anything. I am thoroughly, completely, adequately, gloriously and triumphantly a heretic." He rejected Christian orthodoxy and became a Christian Unitarian. From 1912 until the founding of the People's Church in 1922, Bradley conducted Sunday services at a number of Chicago theaters.

== Peoples Church ==
Peoples Church of Chicago called Bradley to be its pastor before 1914. He based his ministry on the creed of "the Good, the True and the Beautiful" and affiliating with the Unitarian Conference. In 1926, the Church moved into its home at 941 W. Lawrence. Bradley built the Church into a major Chicago institution with four thousand members. His radio program reached millions of listeners. The Church continued to grow, adding new buildings. It was "one of the most largely attended liberal churches in the world". Bradley retired from the church in 1968, but continued to give sermons and radio programs until 1976.

The Peoples Church of Chicago was one of the first megachurches. Bradley applied the teachings of the Moody Bible Institute in a liberal religion frame. He used his charismatic showmanship to draw crowds, earning the nickname "Protestant Pope of Chicago". The Peoples Church shriveled after his death.

Writer Irna Phillips, a lifelong Chicago resident, credited Bradley's radio sermons with inspiring her creation of the soap opera Guiding Light, which ran on radio and then on television for a total of 72 years.

Preston Bradley Hall, in the Chicago Cultural Center, is named for him.

== Positions ==
Some of his preaching "defied obscenity laws," which made him unpopular. He took anti-fascist and pro-civil rights stands that further impacted his popularity.

== Civic work ==
- Since 1925: Member of the board of the Chicago Public Library
- Member of the board of the Illinois State Teachers College and Normal School
- Founder and president of the Izaak Walton League (a conservation group)
- Charter member of the Chicago Human Relations Commission
- Trustee of the Municipal Art League

== Honorary degrees ==
- D.C.L. from Hamilton College of Law (Chicago, Illinois)
- L.L.D. from Lake Forest College (Lake Forest, Illinois)
- D.D. from Meadville Theological Seminary (Chicago, Illinois)

== Personal life ==
Bradley married Grace Thayer in 1915. She died in 1950. Their adopted son, James, died in 1951. Bradley married June Haslet in 1952. (11 SPE) In 1976 he moved to Vermont, where he died June 1, 1983.

== Published work ==
- Along the Way: An Autobiography. New York: McKay, 1962
- Between You and Me. Chicago: Aspley House, 1967
- Courage for Today. Indianapolis: Bobbs-Merrill, 1934
- Happiness Through Creative Living. Garden City, New York: Hanover House, 1955
- Life and You. New York, London: Harper & Brothers, 1939
- Mastering Fear. Indianapolis: Bobbs-Merrill, 1935
- Meditations and My Daily Strength. New York: Permabooks, 1950
- New Wealth for You. New York: Stokes, 1941
- Power from Right Thinking. Indianapolis: Bobbs-Merrill, 1936
- Was Abraham Lincoln a Christian? Peoria, IL: Edward J. Jacob, 1949

Many of his sermons, radio programs and other writings are held at the University of Illinois, Chicago.
