= Joyce D. Miller =

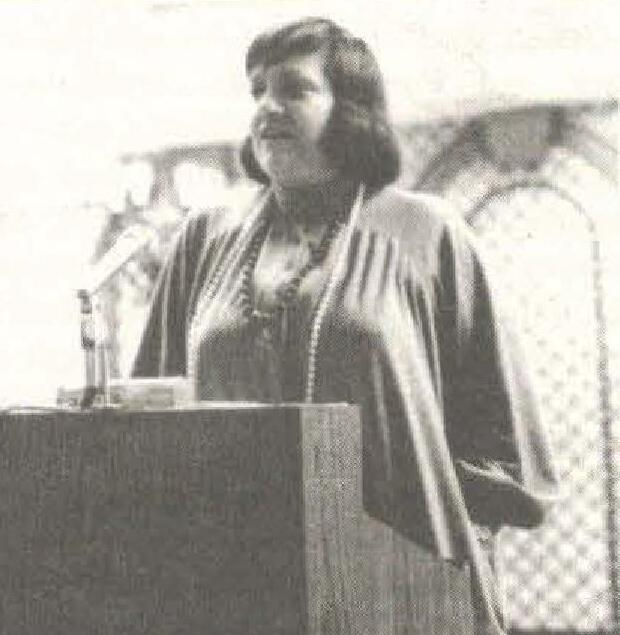
Miller in 1979

Joyce Hannah Dannen Miller (June 19, 1928 – June 30, 2012) was an advocate for women in the labor movement, and a founding member of the Coalition of Labor Union Women. A vice-president of the Amalgamated Clothing Workers of America, she was the first woman elected to the executive board of the American Federation of Labor – Congress of Industrial Organizations (AFL-CIO).

== Early life and education ==
Born Hannah Joyce Dannen in Chicago in 1928, her mother was a teacher at the Spalding school, "Chicago's first public school exclusively for children with disabilities," and her father the owner of a shoe store on Chicago's West Side. She attended the University of Chicago, earning a bachelor's degree in 1950 and a master's degree in social sciences and education in 1951.

== Career ==
Unable to find a professional union job despite her education, she took a secretarial position with the Cooperative League of America. Her brother is Avrum H. Dannen, esq. She married Jay A. Miller, who also worked for unions, in 1952 (they divorced in 1965). She had three children: Joshua, Adam, and Rebecca. She became education director for the Amalgamated Clothing Workers of America in 1962, and later rose to vice-president. She helped set up day care, legal assistance and college scholarship programs for union members and their children. She was a founding member of the Coalition of Labor Union Women (CLUW) in 1974, and later served as its president. In 1980 she was the first woman to be elected to the executive board of the AFL-CIO. President Bill Clinton in 1993 appointed her the executive director of the Glass Ceiling Commission established by the Civil Rights Act of 1991 to study the barriers to the advancement of women and minorities in large corporations.

Trade union offices
Preceded by Olga Madar	President of the Coalition of Labor Union Women; 1977–1993	Succeeded by Gloria T. Johnson
Preceded by John Sweeney	AFL-CIO delegate to the Trades Union Congress; 1983	Succeeded by Patrick J. Campbell
