= A. Philip Randolph Institute =

Organization for African-American trade unionists

A. Philip Randolph Institute (APRI)
- Founded: 1965
- Type: 501(C)4
- Tax ID no.: 13-2548181
- Location: Washington, D.C.
- Leader: Clayola Brown, president
- Affiliations: AFL-CIO
- Revenue: $642,013 (2015)
- Website: apri.org

The A. Philip Randolph Institute (APRI) is an organization for African-American trade unionists, a constituency group of the AFL-CIO, that advocates social, labor, and economic change at the state and federal level, using legal and legislative means.

== History ==
In response to the 1963 Children's Crusade and the passage of the Voting Rights Act, A. Philip Randolph, former head of the Brotherhood of Sleeping Car Porters, an early black trade union, and Bayard Rustin, founded the APRI to forge an alliance between the civil rights movement and the labor movement. These efforts got them on the master list of Nixon political opponents. Bayard Rustin served as the first president of the organization, serving from 1965 to 1979, after which he became a co-chair for the organization.

APRI describes its mission as a fight for racial equality and economic justice. It works with black trade unionists, seeking to build relations between labor and abor and black communities. APRI was also the spearhead for an organization called the "Black Alliance", and together they would support the trade union movement. APRI has 150 chapters in 36 states.

== Current status ==
APRI is currently led by National President Clayola Brown, a post she has held since August 2004. Brown also serves on the boards of Amalgamated Bank and the Centers for Disease Control and Prevention's Business Response to AIDS/Labor Response to AIDS. She was appointed to the National Commission on Employment Policy by President Bill Clinton, and appointed a member of the New York State Workforce Investment Board by Gov. George Pataki (Black Leadership Forum, Inc., 2002–03).

APRI filed suit against the state of Ohio, charging that its process of purging voter roles violates the National Voter Registration Act of 1993 and the Help America Vote Act of 2002. The Supreme Court agreed to hear Husted v. Randolph Institute in 2017.
