= Coalition of Labor Union Women =

U.S. nonprofit organization

CLUW
- Coalition of Labor Union Women

- Protest in Seattle, 2008
- Founded: March 24, 1974
- Headquarters: Washington, D.C.
- Location: United States
- Key people: Sylvia J. Ramos, president
- Affiliations: AFL–CIO
- Website: www.cluw.org

The Coalition of Labor Union Women (CLUW) is a nonprofit, nonpartisan organization of trade union women affiliated with the AFL–CIO. The CLUW is a bridging organization that seeks to create connections between the feminist movement and the labor movement in the United States. The organization works towards overcoming past constraints and conflicts in pursuance of relationship improvement between those movements, and thus enabling broad coalitions. The CLUW is the only national organization solely for women union members and is one of six constituency groups within the AFL–CIO. It is based in the headquarters of the AFL–CIO in Washington, D.C. CLUW pursues by four goals: to bring women into union leadership, to organize unorganized women workers, to bring women's issues onto the labor agenda, and to involve women into political action.

== History ==
Women have participated in unions throughout time. Beginning with the first national women's labor union in the United States, The Daughters of St. Crispin. Followed by many other unions such as: printer unions, The Knights of Labor, Women's Trade Union League, National Organization for Women, and many more. However, these unions did not support all women and discriminated against certain races.

CLUW was founded in Chicago, Illinois, in 1974 by a group of diverse women labor union leaders as part of a wave of constituency group organizing within the AFL–CIO. The founding members wanted an organization that did not discriminate among races, and to also include unionized women workers.

The impetus for the formation of CLUW came in June 1973 when women labor union leaders, led by Olga Madar, who later became first president, of the United Auto Workers and Addie Wyatt of the United Food and Commercial Workers met to discuss the formation of a new AFL–CIO body. They sought to create a more effective voice for women in the labor movement. Other unionists involved included Dorothy Haener, Edith Van Horne and Ora Lee Malone.

In March 1974, union women from over 58 unions and 41 states gathered in Chicago to establish an organization based upon women and labor movements. There were over 3,000 women in attendance. The purpose of this organization was to increase the number of organized women workers, implement affirmative action, work for the passage of legislation favorable to women workers, and increase women's involvement in their unions. Furthermore, this organization would establish a union that would be more responsive to the needs of women in the labor force. Therefore, the Coalition of Labor Union Women was formed due to political socialization and mainly the need of the founding members to address union identities amongst feminists. CLUW was founded as a result of protests starting from the late 1960s and throughout the early 1970s. The diffusion of feminist consciousness brought the uprising of feminist organizations.

=== Timeline ===
- 1973, St. Louis, MS. An organizing conference, chaired by Ora Lee Malone, was held.
- 1974- March 23–24, Chicago, IL. The founding conference elected Olga M. Madar as the president. Adopted four goals: organized the unorganized, promoted affirmative action, had more women participate in their union, increased women's presence in political activities
- 1975- First National Women's Health Conference. AFL–CIO endorsed the Equal Rights Amendment, and CLUW became first to move its convention from non-ratified Equal Rights Amendment state to ratified state.
- 1976- First National Convention on Pay Equity
- 1977- During National Convention, Joyce D. Miller was elected president. CLUW came together with women's civil rights and religious groups to stand up for minimum wage increase. CLUW was part of the Decade of Women Conference.
- 1978- CLUW Center for Education and Research was founded.
- 1979- First Biennial National Convention and CLUW health/safety series took place.
- 1980- CLUW president, Joyce D. Miller, became the first woman to be part of the AFL–CIO Executive Council.
- 1994- CLUW celebrated 20th anniversary. Conferenced on National Health Reform and Women in Global Economy.
- 1996- Conferences on Voter Education and Participation, organized for political action and union women empowerment.
- 1998- Conferenced on CLUW's goals and worked to end violence against women.
- 2000- Launched 200 Election Project which focused on having women registering to vote, getting more involved in political activities and participating in elections.
- 2001- Participated in NOW's emergency action for women's lives. Initiated campaign for inclusion of contraceptives in union health care plans. Received $225,000 CDC grant for HIV/AIDS Awareness and Prevention Program.
- 2002- CLUW supported action for UFCW's Justice for Wal-Mart workers and UNITES's Behind the Label anti-sweatshop initiative.
- 2004- CLUW hosted a town hall meeting in New Orleans before Election Day to allow voters to access all the major organizations they wanted to represent
- 2005- CLUW's Contraceptive Equity Project was well received, CLUW then started Cervical Cancer Prevention Works. CLUW also participated in Diversity Summit with the AFI-CIO convention. CLUW supported the Wake-Up Wal-Mart campaign to promote anti-worker, anti-union practices of the largest employer.
- 2006- CLUW joined with Sister Study to help locate women with breast cancer and to research the causes. CLUW's Contraceptive Project did really well when the male Masters, Mates, and Pilots Union adds contraceptive coverage for its 6,800 member and spouses. Cervical Cancer Prevention Works project worked closely with CLUW chapters and unions in California to secure HPV test coverage there.
- 2007- CLUW celebrated the reintroduction of Women and Equality Amendment. Participated in Voices of Iraqi Workers Solidarity Tour, allowing them to work closely with Iraqi workers. A panel addressed "Diversity in the Labor Movement-Dialogue and Action." Delegates set policy through the support of 18 resolutions relating to the Employee Free Choice Act and the need to make health care issues a cornerstone. Called on withdrawal of troops and private contractors in Iraq, and then further calling on women and people of color in union leadership and support of USW's.

== Structure and governance ==
CLUW is governed by its membership. The membership meets in a biennial convention in October in odd-numbered years. At least six times each year, the National Officers Council meet to act on organization business concepts and to plan these conventions. Members may belong to any labor union, and be active or retired. Provisions exist for associate membership for those who are not union members or on long-term layoff. Members must belong to a local chapter, or, when no local chapter exists, be a member at-large. National unions and local chapters may elect one delegate to the national convention for every five CLUW members. The membership discusses and sets policy, and elects the officers and board of directors of the organization.

In the direction of the national president and national staff, CLUW's headquarters are located in Washington, D.C. The national staff contains the organization's executive director, the director of the CLUW Center for Education and Research, the national organizer, and two additional staff positions. The term for national officers is four years. There are also 12 vice presidents. The president-emeritus, executive vice-president emeritus, officers, and vice presidents comprise a National Executive Board (NEB).

CLUW's standing committees take care of administrative tasks like elections, archives, recruitments, finances, and introducing topics of devoted concern. The CLUW constitution also provides for a National Officers Council. The Council governs CLUW in the period between conventions. Its rulings and policies are binding unless reversed by the convention. CLUW take initiative to recruit young working women concerning such issues that affect their lives, unity with coworkers, and demonstrating the union wage advantage.

CLUW has both state and local chapters. The NEB is empowered to charter new chapters, and Article XIII of the CLUW constitution governs the conditions under which they may be established. Currently, there are about 75 CLUW chapters in the U.S. and Canada, with members in about 60 international American and Canadian unions.

== Relationship with AFL–CIO ==
CLUW is one of six constituent groups of the AFL–CIO. The mutualism between the two organizations was never let known to the public by the CLUW News or the CLUW constitution. CLUW relies on the AFL–CIO for funding. Members from both groups characterize the support as mutual. CLUW helps the AFL–CIO by associating women with labor movements and the AFL–CIO provides money for CLUW. CLUW members believe that even though they are a support group of the AFL–CIO, it did not mean they agree on everything the AFL–CIO believes in and likewise, have their own independence.

According to a respondent,

We call us a "support group" because mostly and fundamentally we support each other. However, we are not the AFL–CIO. We are the women's movement within the AFL–CIO. And I think we are... considered to be more progressive in certain areas of the labor movement and in regard to women's issues and children and family. So, we are looked at with respect, and hope and admiration from ... the members of the AFL–CIO.

== Bridging organization ==
CLUW strived to build coalitions between women's issues toward the labor agenda. Coalitions and alliances were generated among the women's and labor movements. The unions were altered from within and demonstrated "unobtrusive mobilization," a method that accomplished feminist goals. CLUW's advancement on issues like childcare, pay equity, and sexual harassment helped develop a feminist labor agenda. For example, when day care workers went on strike in 1989 in West Berlin, the strike consisted of day care workers. The strike was assumed to be a labor affair rather than a women's concern. Therefore, leaders in the women's movement did not perceive that it was their responsibility. The day care worker's strike was an issue for women, but the day care workers gave women the opportunity to work and earn some sort of income even though the wages were still low. Miscommunication between the labor and women's movement was a factor that played a role in the strike's failure. Had there been a bridging organization like CLUW, then improved developments could have resulted. Bridging organizations establish the blueprint for future partnerships. Women's labor, civil rights, and other social movement organizations formed coalitions with CLUW.

== Impact ==
CLUW represented networks of union women even though the organization itself contained few members and staff. The National Executive Board members were very active with the women's movement, the civil rights movement, and the labor movement at all different local, regional, and national levels. CLUW members were very involved with other organizations, in addition to the CLUW. CLUW united the goals of the women's and labor movements by addressing issues such as childcare, sexual harassment, and pay equity. Working-class women and women of color were attracted to CLUW because it was able to touch upon the interests that women had, such as worker's issues, family issues and labor issues. because mainstream second wave feminist organizations had alienated working-class women and women of color by not addressing issues in these ways.

== Diversity ==
The CLUW is a very diverse organization with respect to not only education and occupation but also gender, race, ethnicity, and sexual orientation. In 1994, 30% of CLUW were women of color. 20% of members were African American, 6% were Hispanic and Latina, 1% were Asian American, 2% were Native American, and 2% considered themselves as another ethnicity. The diversity in the CLUW indicated the significant unionization rate of women of color. The majority of the CLUW establishing members were women of color. They wanted an organization that included unionized women workers and did not discriminate among races. Men were also members of the organization, representing 13% of the CLUW. CLUW wanted to include men in their organization to demonstrate that they are not anti-male and that they are accepting of everyone.

== Programs ==
CLUW holds educational conferences the day before each National Executive Board (NEB) meeting. The conferences cover a wide variety of topics, from equal pay to organizing new workers to family-friendly collective bargaining language.

In 1979, CLUW established the CLUW Center for Education and Research. The center is a nonprofit entity, which provides education and training programs to CLUW members. The goal of the Center is to train members to become more effective advocates for working women in the workplace and the labor movement.

CLUW sponsors a number of women's health initiatives. These cover breast and cervical cancer awareness and a project to increase access to contraception. In 2000, the Equal Employment Opportunity Commission (EEOC) stated that the employers can not show bias against their employees' health insurance by denying benefits for contraceptives. If they offer benefits for drugs and services that are used to prevent other medical conditions. In the Spring of 2001 the CLUW established the Contraceptive Equity Project to notify union members and women about legal, political, and medical issues that were related to gaining contraceptive coverage. CLUW works with the National Women's Law Center (NWLC) in the National Council of Women's Organizations. In September 2010, the new health care law went to effect which required insurance plans to cover certain defensive health care services, that includes mammograms, smoking cessation treatment, folic acid, among others, at no cost.

== Presidents ==
1974: Olga Madar
1977: Joyce D. Miller
1993: Gloria T. Johnson
2004: Susan Phillips
2005: Marsha Zakowski
2009: Karen J. See
2013: Connie Leak
2017: Elise Bryant
