= Cliff Evans =

Cliff Evans may refer to:

- Clif Evans (born 1948), politician in Manitoba, Canada
- Clifford R. Evans (1937–2018), Canadian trade unionist and UFCW leader
- Cliff Evans (artist), American artist of Australian origin
- Cliff Evans (rugby league), Welsh rugby league footballer and coach
- Cliff Evans, a character in the short story "Cipher in the Snow"

== See also ==
- Clifford Evans (disambiguation)
