= Wendell Young III =

American trade unionist

- Born: Wendell W. Young III; July 5, 1936; Mayfair, Philadelphia
- Died: January 1, 2013 (aged 76)
- Occupation: Labor leader
- Years active: 1956-2005

Wendell W. Young III (July 6, 1938 – January 1, 2013) was an American labor unionist who served as president of the UFCW Local 1776 for 43 years. During his term in office, he exerted influence over Philadelphia politics and was active in social justice issues.

== Early life ==
Young grew up in Mayfair, Philadelphia, and first got involved in the Retail Clerks International Union (RCIU) Local 1537, at age 16, when he was working as a part-time store clerk. Young attended Saint Joseph's University, where he was heavily influenced by Jesuit philosophy, graduating in 1960. Young was introduced to politics by the John F. Kennedy 1960 presidential campaign.

== Career ==
Young became president of the RCIU in 1963 at the age of 23, having run on a campaign to reform the union, making him the youngest labor leader in Pennsylvania at the time. In his position, Young was an advocate for civil rights, and participated in the 1963 March on Washington.

Originally a staunch anti-communist, Young's views towards the ideology shifted in 1967 when he visited Brazil, and saw the local communists working with the Catholic Church in order to assist people. This experience substantially shifted Young's views on foreign policy, and he became fully opposed to the Vietnam War as a result. Young was one of the few labor leaders who built ties with the New Left, joining student protests following the Kent State Shootings. His opposition to the Vietnam War and ties to the New Left unnerved many members of the RCIU, who initiated impeachment proceedings against him, which Young survived by only one vote. Young served as the Pennsylvania director of George McGovern's 1972 presidential campaign.

Young was a committed opponent of Philadelphia Mayor Frank Rizzo, whom he viewed as racist. Rizzo in turn hated Young, describing him as a "leftist pig". Young was active in organizing opposition to Rizzo, and supported his political opponents in runs for local office. Young's opposition to Rizzo extended to supporting his Republican opponents in the general election. The RCIU merged with the Amalgamated Meat Cutters in 1979, to form the United Food and Commercial Workers union, with Young remaining president of the combined local organization. Young ran for the Democratic nomination for Pennsylvania's 4th congressional district in 1980, but finished third in the primary.

In 1995, Young supported the campaign of John Sweeney for president of the AFL-CIO. From 1995 to 2005, he hosted a weekly talk show on WHAT (AM), in which he discussed labor-related issues. Despite his stalwart progressivism, Young was an opponent of LGBT rights until late in his career, when he re-examined his views and worked to negotiate contracts to protect individuals from being fired for their sexual orientation. Young retired from his position as president of the UFCW 1776 in 2005, after he was diagnosed with Parkinson's disease. He was succeeded by his son, Wendell Young IV.

Young died on January 1, 2013, from liver cancer. His funeral mass was held at St. Philip Neri Church, located in Lafayette Hill, Pennsylvania. His memoirs, A Life in Philadelphia Labor and Politics, were published posthumously in 2019.
