= UFCW Local 832 =

Trade union in Manitoba, Canada

- United Food and Commercial Workers International Union, Local 832
- Type: Local union
- Headquarters: Winnipeg, Manitoba, Canada
- Location: Manitoba, Canada
- Members: 19,000 (2024)
- President: Jeff Traeger
- Parent organization: United Food and Commercial Workers
- Affiliations: Manitoba Federation of Labour
- Website: ufcw832.com

UFCW Local 832 is a local union of the United Food and Commercial Workers union in Manitoba, Canada.

== History ==
Founded in 1938, Local 832 was approximately 700 members strong by 1964 when Bernard Christophe was elected president. Christophe held the presidency of Local 832 until ending his 38-year stretch as head of the local by stepping down in 2002 . He was replaced by Robert Ziegler in the fall of 2002, who held the office until he recently retired on 1 December 2011. On 24 October 2011, the local's executive board elected Jeff Traeger to be the local's third full-time president in its 73-year history. Jeff had been the treasurer since 2004, and Bea Bruske was also elected by the board to serve the remainder of Jeff's term as Secretary/Treasurer (the first female in an executive administrative role in the local's history).

The local was recently successful in organizing a group of Mexican agricultural workers at Mayfair Foods. Although enough workers signed union cards to automatically certify in September 2006, a series of disputes before the Manitoba Labour Board pushed back their certification until 26 June 2007. This certification has national importance, they became the first group of organized foreign farm workers in Canada.

== See also ==
- UFCW Local 1776, Philadelphia
