= Openn Negotiation =

Openn
- Type: Private
- Industry: Real estate
- Founded: April 2016; 10 years ago in Perth, Western Australia
- Headquarters: Perth, Western Australia Australia
- Area served: Australia and New Zealand
- Products: Openn Negotiation; Openn Offers; Openn Tender
- Website: www.openn.com

Openn is a platform that facilitates real time communication and negotiation in a property transaction. Openn combines flexibility of a private treaty with the transparency of auction price discovery. Openn Offers supports a traditional private treaty process with improved transparency. Openn Tender allows buyers to submit tender offers digitally before a set deadline for the agent and seller to review. It was launched in Australia in 2016, and has seen significant growth largely due to COVID-19 restrictions on traditional home inspections and on-site auctions.

== Operations ==
The Openn platform has been built with the intention to offer multiple sales methods for property transactions. Openn Negotiation is the primary product offering and sales process – it combines the flexibility of a private treaty with the transparency of auction price discovery.

Functionally, the Openn platform provides agents with a tool to facilitate real time communication and negotiation between all stakeholders in a property transaction. The platform provides additional benefits to agents such as digital contracting, data retention and integration to agency customer relationship management (CRM) systems to promote efficient work processes and improved outcomes for their customers.

Openn's online bidding platform is transparent for buyers, sellers and agents.

Since 2017, Openn has sold $12 billion worth of property in Australia.

== Voluntary Administration ==
On 6 May 2024 Openn advised the ASX that Richard Tucker and John Bumbak of KordaMentha had been appointed administrators to the company to "maximise the chances of continuing in existence". At the time Openn said that if this isn't achievable then the voluntary administration would result in "a better return for the creditors and members of the company than would result from an immediate winding up of the company".

On 10 July 2024 the administrators announced that they had sold off the North American and Canadian operations of the business to Final Offer, a North American online offer and negotiation platform for residential real estate.

== Partnerships and integrations ==
- August 2021 – CoreLogic onthehouse.com.au
- April 2022 – The Canadian Real Estate Association REALTOR.ca

== Awards ==
- March 2021 – United States National Association of Realtors REACH Program

== Patents ==
- Australian Patent – 2017280108
- US Patent – US 11,250,498 B2

== See also ==
- Online auction
