= Marc Perrone =

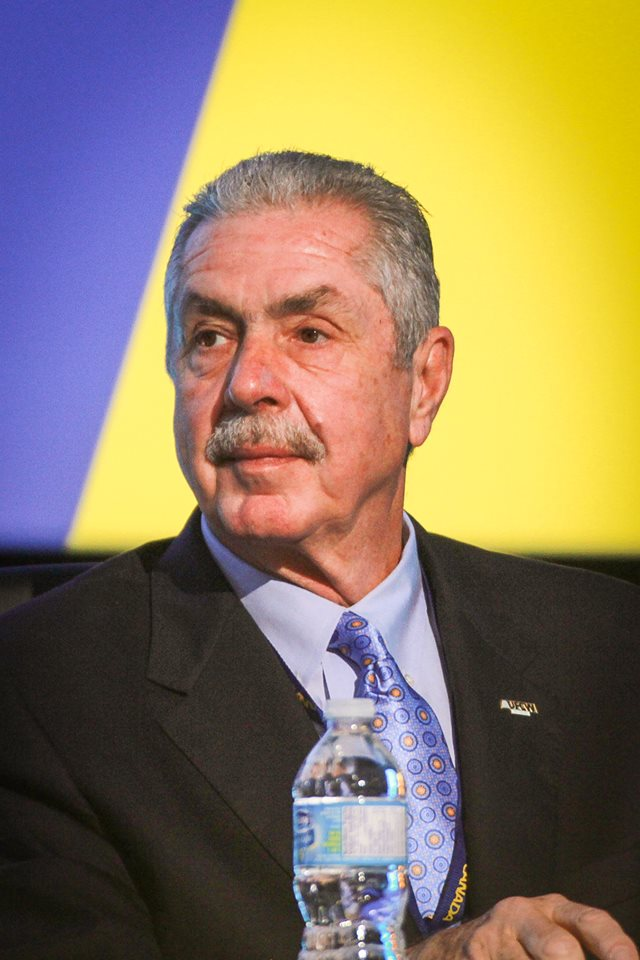

4th International President of the United Food and Commercial Workers
- Preceded by: Joseph T. Hansen
- Succeeded by: Milton Jones
- In office 2014–2025

Personal details
- Born: November 14, 1955 (age 70) Hearne, Texas
- Party: Democratic Party (United States)
- Occupation: Grocery retail clerk, trade unionist

Anthony "Marc" Perrone (born November 14, 1955) is an American labor union leader.

Born in Hearne, Texas, Perrone grew up in Pine Bluff, Arkansas. He began working at a local Weingarten's grocery store in 1971 when he was 16, and joined the Retail Clerks International Union. He studied at the University of Arkansas at Little Rock and the University of Arkansas at Pine Bluff, in an attempt to enter medical school, but ended up with a degree in labor studies from Antioch University.

After college, Perrone began working as a union organizer for the Retail Clerks and what would soon become the United Food and Commercial Workers. In the field, he participated in and led a number of campaigns and projects for the union before going to Washington, D.C., to be the international's assistant organizing director when he was 28 years old. While in Washington, Perrone then became assistant to the international president, but shortly thereafter moved to New York City to serve as regional director.

After serving as the union's Region One director, Perrone returned to Washington and spent the next several years in a numbrer of senior UFCW positions. In 2004, he was elected UFCW international secretary-treasurer, and in 2014, with the retirement of Joseph T. Hansen, Perrone was elected the eighth international president of UFCW by the union's international executive board. In 2018, his leadership of the union was confirmed by 3,000-plus delegates to UFCW's eight regular convention -- who acclaimed him as international president, and in 2023 Perrone was reelected as UFCW international president by delegates to the 9th regular UFCW convention in Las Vegas.

Perrone, as UFCW leader, focused on reducing the union's pension liabilities and making the international president more accessible to rank-and-file members of the union.

Perrone retired in 2025.
