= Joseph T. Hansen =

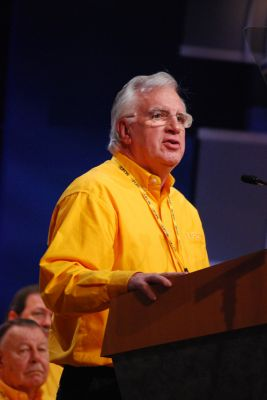

3rd International President of the United Food and Commercial Workers
- In office 2004–2014
- Preceded by: Douglas H. Dority
- Succeeded by: Marc Perrone

3rd President of UNI Global Union
- In office 2000–2014
- Preceded by: Maj-Len Remahl
- Succeeded by: Joe de Bruyn

Personal details
- Born: 1943 (age 82–83) Chicago, Illinois, U.S.
- Party: Democratic Party (United States)
- Occupation: Retail butcher, trade unionist

Joseph T. Hansen is a North American labor leader, best known for his work as president of the United Food and Commercial Workers International Union (UFCW).

== Early life ==
Hansen was born in Chicago in 1942. He was the eldest of four children. His mother was of Irish descent and his father of Norwegian descent. His family moved to Milwaukee, Wisconsin shortly before high school. In Milwaukee, Hansen attended Marquette Preparatory School.

== Activism and career ==
Hansen began his career in 1962 as a meat cutter in Milwaukee, Wisconsin, where he became a member of Local 73 of the Amalgamated Meat Cutters and Butcher Workmen of North America. He was an outspoken rank-and-file activist who won election to local union office, and in 1973 became an international staff representative.

In 1979, the Amalgamated Meat Cutters (AMC) and the Retail Clerks International Union (RCIU) merged to form the UFCW.

In 1985, Hansen was appointed UFCW northcentral region director in Minnesota and was elected a UFCW international vice president the following year. In 1990, Hansen was appointed UFCW pacific region director in California and four years later became director of UFCW's food processing, packing and manufacturing division.

Hansen was elected UFCW international secretary-treasurer in 1997 and international president in 2004. He was re-elected international president in 2008 and 2013.

Hansen is a founder and former chair of the Change to Win Federation.

Hansen is the Founding National Chair of the National Commission on Immigration and Customs Enforcement (ICE) Misconduct and Violations of 4th Amendment Rights.

As UFCW president, Hansen was a driving force in the creation of UNI Global Union in 2004, and served as its founding president.

In September 2010, President Obama appointed Hansen to the United States Trade Representatives Advisory Committee for Trade Policy and negotiations and in February 2011, President Obama appointed Hansen to the President’s Council on Jobs and Competitiveness.

== Awards ==
In 2015, Hansen was presented with the Bill Olwell Champion of Equality Award for his leadership on advancing LGBTQ issues within the union and beyond.
