= Bea Bruske =

Canadian labour leader (born 1969)

President of the Canadian Labour Congress
- Incumbent
- Assumed office June 18, 2021
- Preceded by: Hassan Yussuff

Personal details
- Born: January 22, 1969 (age 57)
- Party: New Democratic Party
- Education: University of Manitoba

Beatrice Bruske (born January 22, 1969) is a Canadian labour leader and the current president of the Canadian Labour Congress, an organization that advocates on behalf of three million working people across Canada.

Bruske was elected President June 18, 2021, at the Canadian Labour Congress's first virtual convention. The convention was originally scheduled to be held in Vancouver in May 2020 but was delayed due to COVID-19.

Bruske is only the second woman to hold the position; the first was Shirley Carr (1986–1992).

In 2022 Bruske was named to Maclean's "Power List", the magazine's ranking of the country's 50 most powerful people in Canada. Bruske is active in national and the international labour movement and participated in the G7's Labour7 which fights for the rights and interests of working people.

== Early life ==
Bruske emigrated to Winnipeg, Manitoba as a child. Her family left West Berlin, Germany, in 1981, because her father was offered an engineering job with Teshmont Consultants in Manitoba. At 16, she was hired as a part-time grocery clerk at a Westfair grocery store in Winnipeg and became a member of United Food and Commercial Workers union (UFCW) UFCW Local 832. In 1987, Westfair staff across Manitoba went on strike for 125 days, giving Bruske her start in Canada's labour movement. After the Westfair strike, Bruske became a shop steward with UFCW Local 832.

Bruske went on to become a member of the health and safety committee for Local 832 and subsequently was elected to be vice-president of the local's executive board. She served as the local's secretary-treasurer, where she was responsible for administering the largest private-sector union local in Manitoba. Bruske was elected vice-president of the UFCW Canada National Council, where she helped set the strategic direction for the national union.

== 2021 federal election ==
During the 2021 Canadian federal election, the Bruske CLC launched a mobilization campaign that advocated for a post-COVID-19 economic recovery plan centred on workers. Under Bruske, the CLC choose not to endorse a party, but instead campaigned for individual candidates.

During the campaign, Bruske was active in the media advocating on key labour issues and holding parties to account for their proposals. Precarious jobs in the gig economy, such as those offered by companies like Uber, became a prominent issue and the CLC pushed for better protections for these workers.

== Political career ==
Bruske ran as the candidate in Fort Whyte for the Manitoba NDP in the 2019 provincial election. Bruske earned 17.9 per cent of the vote, coming in second to sitting Premier Brian Pallister. She also served as a member of the Executive of the Manitoba NDP.

In 2026, Bruske endorsed Rob Ashton in that year's federal NDP leadership race.

== Personal life ==
Bruske is a graduate of the University of Manitoba's labour studies program. She has two adult children.

== Electoral record ==
2019 Manitoba general election: Fort Whyte
Party	Candidate	Votes	%	±%	Expenditures
Progressive Conservative	Brian Pallister	5,619	57.19	-8.2	$10,131.35
New Democratic	Beatrice Bruske	1,757	17.88	+2.2	$106.40
Liberal	Darrel Morin	1,731	17.62	+6.2	$545.68
Green	Sara Campbell	665	6.77	-0.4	$0.00
Manitoba First	Jason Holenski	54	0.55	-1.1	$1,210.90
Total valid votes		9,826	99.36		
Total rejected ballots		63	0.64	–	
Turnout		9,889	60.35	–	
Eligible voters		16,386			
Progressive Conservative hold		Swing		-5.2	
Source: Elections Manitoba
