= Suffridge =

Suffridge is a surname. Notable people with the surname include:

- Bob Suffridge (1916–1974), American football player
- James Suffridge (1909–2001), American labor unionist
