= Douglas H. Dority =

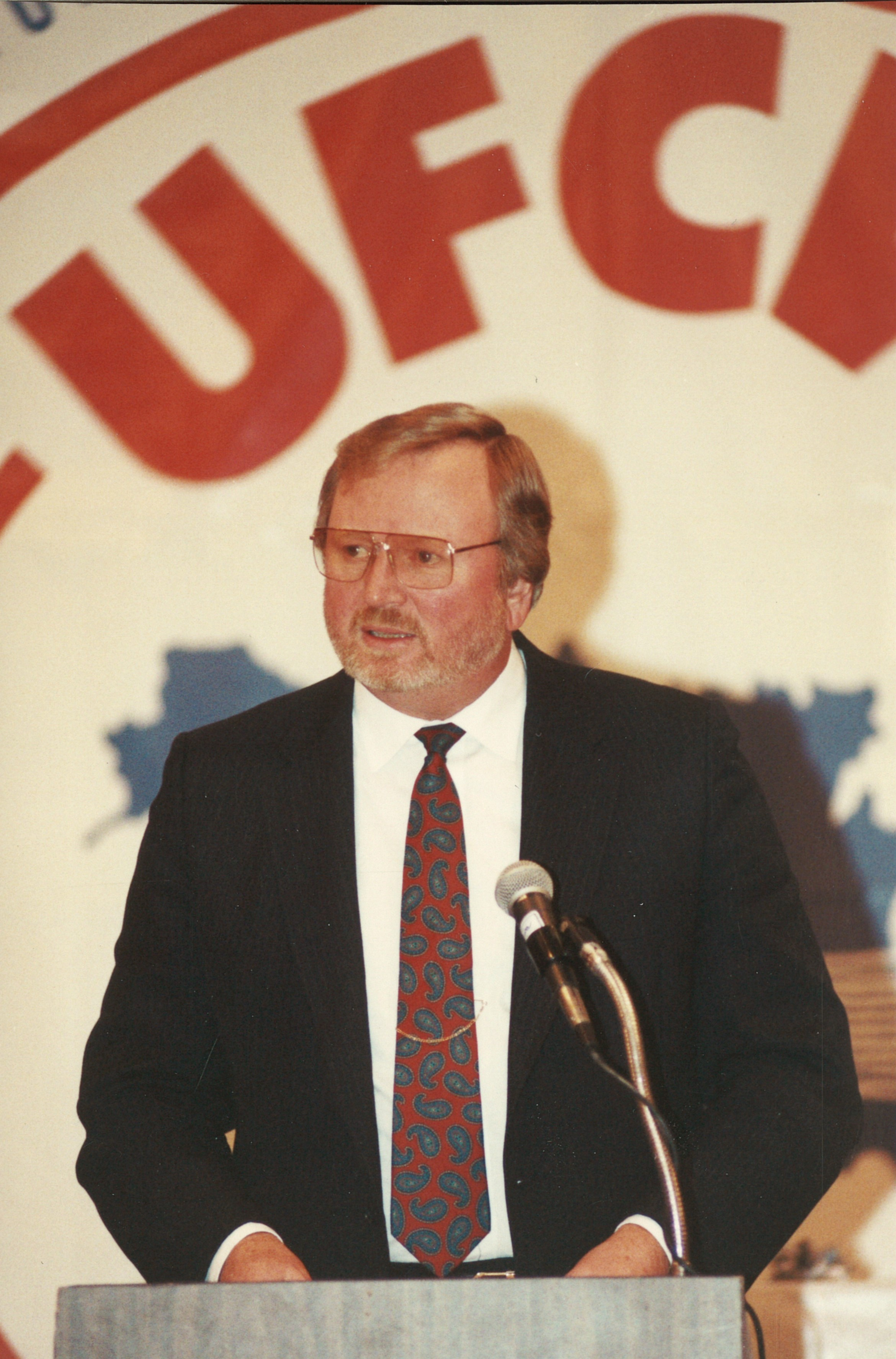

2nd International President of the United Food and Commercial Workers
- In office 1994–2004
- Preceded by: William H. Wynn
- Succeeded by: Joseph T. Hansen

Personal details
- Born: December 9, 1938 Marion, Virginia, U.S.
- Died: November 29, 2025 (aged 86)
- Party: Democratic Party (United States)
- Occupation: Grocery retail clerk, trade unionist

Douglas H. Dority (December 9, 1938 – November 29, 2025) was an American president of the United Food and Commercial Workers International Union (UFCW), one of North America's largest labor unions.

== Early life ==
Dority was born on December 9, 1938, in Marion, Virginia.

== Activism and career ==
Dority's involvement with the union began in the 1960s, when he organized the grocery store where he worked in Lynchburg, Virginia.

Dority worked in various roles for the UFCW (and before 1979, the Retail Clerks International Union) throughout the 1970s, 1980s, and early 1990s. As a field organizer, Dority worked on extended campaigns in both the United States and Canada, and Quebec and southern Ontario in particular.

Upon the retirement of William H. Wynn in 1994, Dority become UFCW international president.

Dority intensified the UFCW's comprehensive campaign against Walmart, investing significant resources in the public relations campaign against the retailer, culminating in a "national day of action" in 2002, where UFCW and other unions held rallies in more than 100 communities throughout the United States. The action was fully backed by the AFL–CIO, where Dority served on the executive-council.

From 2003–04, Dority led the UFCW through one of the largest work stoppages in its history, involving tens of thousands of grocery store workers in protracted strikes in California, Ohio, Kentucky and West Virginia. The action was focused on retaining healthcare benefits.

Dority died on November 29, 2025, at the age of 86.

== Healthcare advocate ==
Upon retiring from the UFCW in 2004, Dority became the president of America’s Agenda: Health Care for All, a labor-backed interest group dedicated to "winning guaranteed access to affordable, high quality healthcare for every American."
