= Prince Edward Island Federation of Labour =

PEIFL
- Prince Edward Island Federation of Labour
- Headquarters: Charlottetown, Prince Edward Island
- Location: Canada
- Key people: Carl Pursey, president
- Affiliations: CLC
- Website: peifed.ca

The Prince Edward Island Federation of Labour (PEIFL) is the Prince Edward Island provincial trade union federation of the Canadian Labour Congress.
