= UFCW Local 1776 =

Trade union in Pennsylvania, United States

- United Food and Commercial Workers, Local 1776
- Founded: 1937
- Headquarters: Plymouth Meeting, Pennsylvania (Main); Pittston, Pennsylvania (North East); Harrisburg, Pennsylvania (South Central); Mountain Top, Pennsylvania (Mountain Top); Canonsburg, Pennsylvania (Pittsburgh)
- Location: United States
- Members: Approximately 20,000
- Key people: Wendell W. Young IV, President
- Parent organization: United Food and Commercial Workers
- Website: www.ufcw1776.org

UFCW Local 1776 represents workers in the state of Pennsylvania for the United Food and Commercial Workers. The larger majority of their members work in grocery stores. The number 1776 refers to the year that the United States Declaration of Independence was drafted in Philadelphia, rather than it being a sequential number of local unions.

== History ==
In 1937, The Retail Clerks & Managers Protective Association (retail clerks) Local 1357 was founded in Philadelphia by employees of American Stores and A&P. In 1963, Local 1357 of the retail clerks had 4,000 members in Philadelphia area supermarkets. By the end of the decade, through the organizing power of president Wendell Young III over 10,000 non-food retail workers and department store employees joined Local 1357.

In 1971, Pennsylvania State Liquor Store clerks joined the ranks of the expanding union. In 1979 the Retail Clerks International Association had merged with the Amalgamated Meat Cutters to create the United Food and Commercial Workers (UFCW) International Union.

== Notable representations ==
Retail food

- Acme Markets
- Giant Eagle
- Rite Aid
- ShopRite
- Super Fresh Food Markets
