= United Food and Commercial Workers =

North American trade union

- United Food and Commercial Workers International Union
- Abbreviation: UFCW
- Formation: June 1979
- Merger of: Amalgamated Meat Cutters; Retail Clerks International Union
- Type: Trade union
- Headquarters: Washington, DC, US
- Locations: Canada; United States
- Members: 1,198,604 (2025)
- President: Milton Jones
- Secretary-Treasurer: Shawn Haggerty
- Affiliations: AFL–CIO; Canadian Labour Congress; IUF; UNI Global Union
- Website: ufcw.org

The United Food and Commercial Workers International Union (UFCW) is a labor union representing approximately 1.2 million workers in the United States and Canada in industries including retail; meatpacking, food processing and manufacturing; hospitality; agriculture; cannabis; chemical trades; security; textile, and health care.

Founded in 1979 through the merger of the Amalgamated Meat Cutters and Butcher Workmen of North America (AMC) union and Retail Clerks International Union, the UFCW grew to become the largest affiliate of the AFL–CIO through numerous subsequent mergers. UFCW is affiliated with the Canadian Labour Congress (CLC) and the AFL–CIO; it disaffiliated from the AFL–CIO in 2005 but reaffiliated in 2013. UFCW is also affiliated to UNI Global Union and the IUF.

UFCW has been associated with organizing actions related to large food corporations like Smithsfields, Walmart, and Stop & Shop. In the 2010s and 2020s, UFCW has been involved in significant organizing efforts around cannabis workers in the United States and agricultural workers in Canada.

== History ==
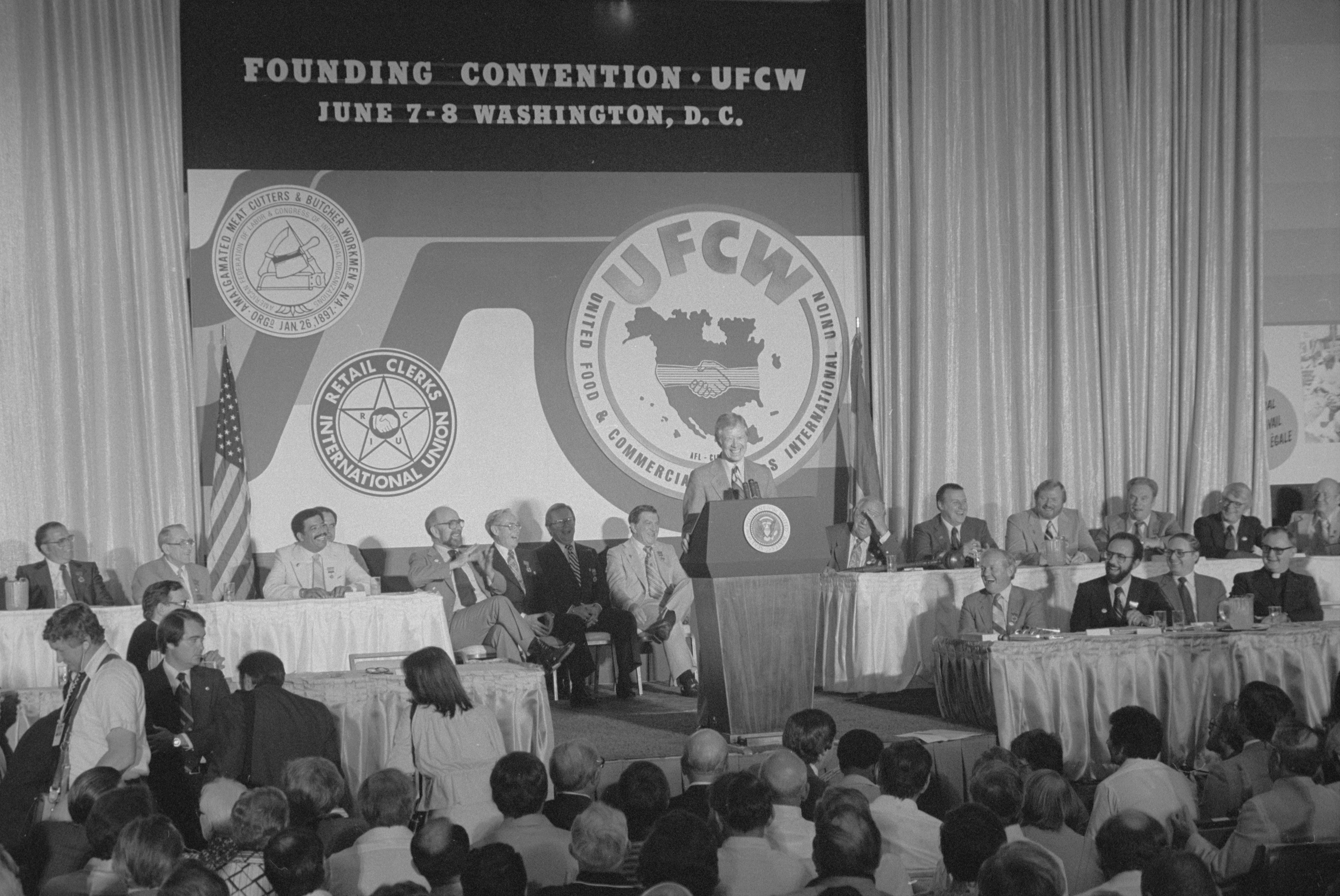
Jimmy Carter speaking at the UFCW's founding convention in Washington D.C. on June 7, 1979

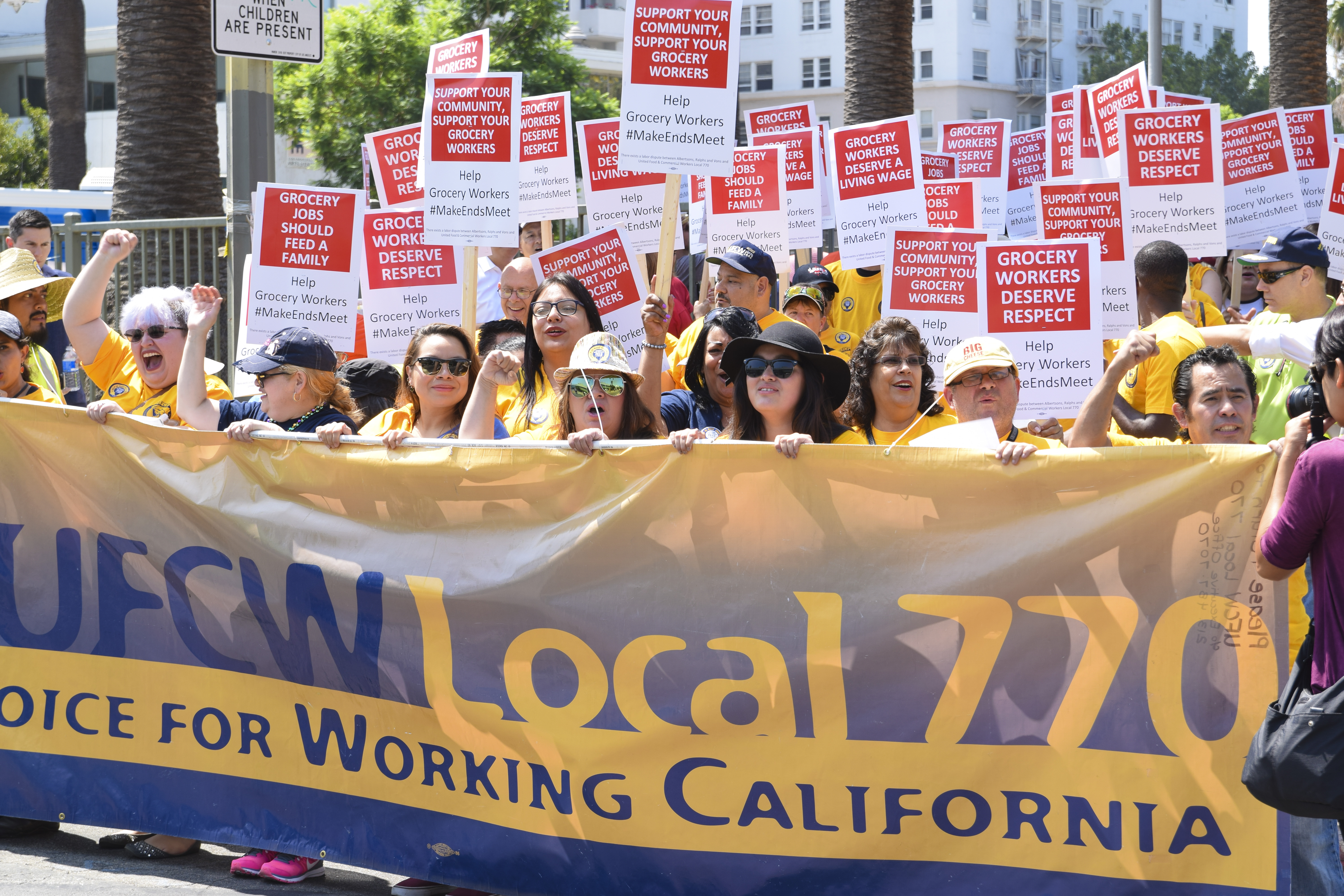
UFCW workers gather for a rally in California on August 2, 2016.

The UFCW was created through the merger of the Amalgamated Meat Cutters and Butcher Workmen of North America (AMC) union and Retail Clerks International Union (RCIU), following the new union's founding convention in June 1979. William H. Wynn, president of the RCIU and one of the designers of the merger, became president of UFCW at the time of its founding. The merger created the largest union affiliated with the AFL–CIO. The UFCW continued to expand both by organizing and merging with several smaller unions between 1980 and 1998. In 1980, the Barbers, Beauticians and Allied Industries International Association merged with UFCW, followed a year later by the United Retail Workers Union (now Local 881).

The UFCW held its first regular international convention in Montreal, Quebec, in 1983. The Insurance Workers' International Union also that year voted to have their 15,000 members join the UFCW.

In 1986 the Canadian Brewery Workers Union merged with the UFCW. However, it was also during this time period that the UFCW leadership did not support the Austin, Minnesota, meatpackers local (P-9) in its contract dispute with the Hormel Foods Corporation, the 1985–86 Hormel strike. The UFCW ultimately struck a deal with Hormel management, seized control of Local P-9, and removed the local union leaders, actions that dealt a blow to the credibility of the UFCW in the eyes of others in the larger labor movement. This dispute was the subject of the award-winning documentary, American Dream.

In 1991 the 5,000 members of the Independent Food Handlers and Warehouse Employees Union in Rhode Island and Massachusetts merged with the UFCW to form Local 791. Bringing about the largest addition to the UFCW since its creation in 1979, on October 1, 1993, the Retail, Wholesale and Department Store Union, and their 100,000 members, merged with the UFCW, becoming the RWDSU District Council of the UFCW.

In 1994 Douglas H. Dority was appointed the second international president by the International Executive Board following the retirement of William Wynn. Dority was subsequently elected to remain International President at the UFCW's fourth regular International Convention in 1998, and again at the fifth regular convention in 2003. In 1994 the 15,000-member strong United Garment Workers of America also merged with the UFCW. A year later, the 15,000-member Textile Workers and the 15,000-member Distillery, Wine and Allied Workers' International Union unions merged with the UFCW, forming respectively the UFCW Textile and Garment Council and the UFCW’s Distillery, Wine and Allied Workers Division.

In 1996 the 40,000 members of the International Chemical Workers' Union merged with the UFCW to form the International Chemical Workers Union Council of the UFCW. A year later, the Canadian Union of Restaurant and Related Employees merged with the UFCW. And the following year, both the United Representatives Guild, Inc. and the Production Service and Sales District Council merged with the UFCW.

In 2003, 80,000 members of the UFCW across the country went on strike to protect their wages and benefit packages.

In 2004 following the retirement of Dority, Joseph T. Hansen was appointed by unanimous vote of the UFCW International Executive Board to be the third international president of the UFCW. He was elected for two consecutive terms as international president by delegates to the UFCW's Regular International Conventions in 2008 and 2013.

In 2005 Hansen announced the UFCW was leaving the AFL–CIO, and joined six other unions – the Teamsters, SEIU, UNITE-HERE, Laborers, United Farm Workers and Carpenters – in creating a new labor federation, the Change to Win Federation. On August 8, 2013, the UFCW announced it was changing its affiliation back to AFL–CIO.

On December 15, 2014, Anthony "Marc" Perrone was appointed the fourth international president of the UFCW by the International Executive Board, following the retirement of Hansen.

== Activity ==
=== Canadian agriculture ===
The UFCW has attempted to organize agricultural workers in Ontario, Canada, since 1995, when the provincial government passed legislation prohibiting those workers from joining unions. In 2001 the Supreme Court of Canada ruled in favour of UFCW Canada in the case of Dunmore v. Ontario. In the ruling, the Court held that the Ontario government violated the Canadian Charter of Rights and Freedoms by denying agricultural workers unionization rights under Ontario labor law as it had infringed on those workers' freedom of association.

In 2004, UFCW Canada and the National Union of Public and General Employees (NUPGE) signed a formal organizing protocol recognizing the UFCW as the union with primary jurisdiction for organizing agricultural workers in Canada and agreeing to cooperate on joint organizing and advocacy campaigns.

=== Medical Cannabis and Hemp Division ===
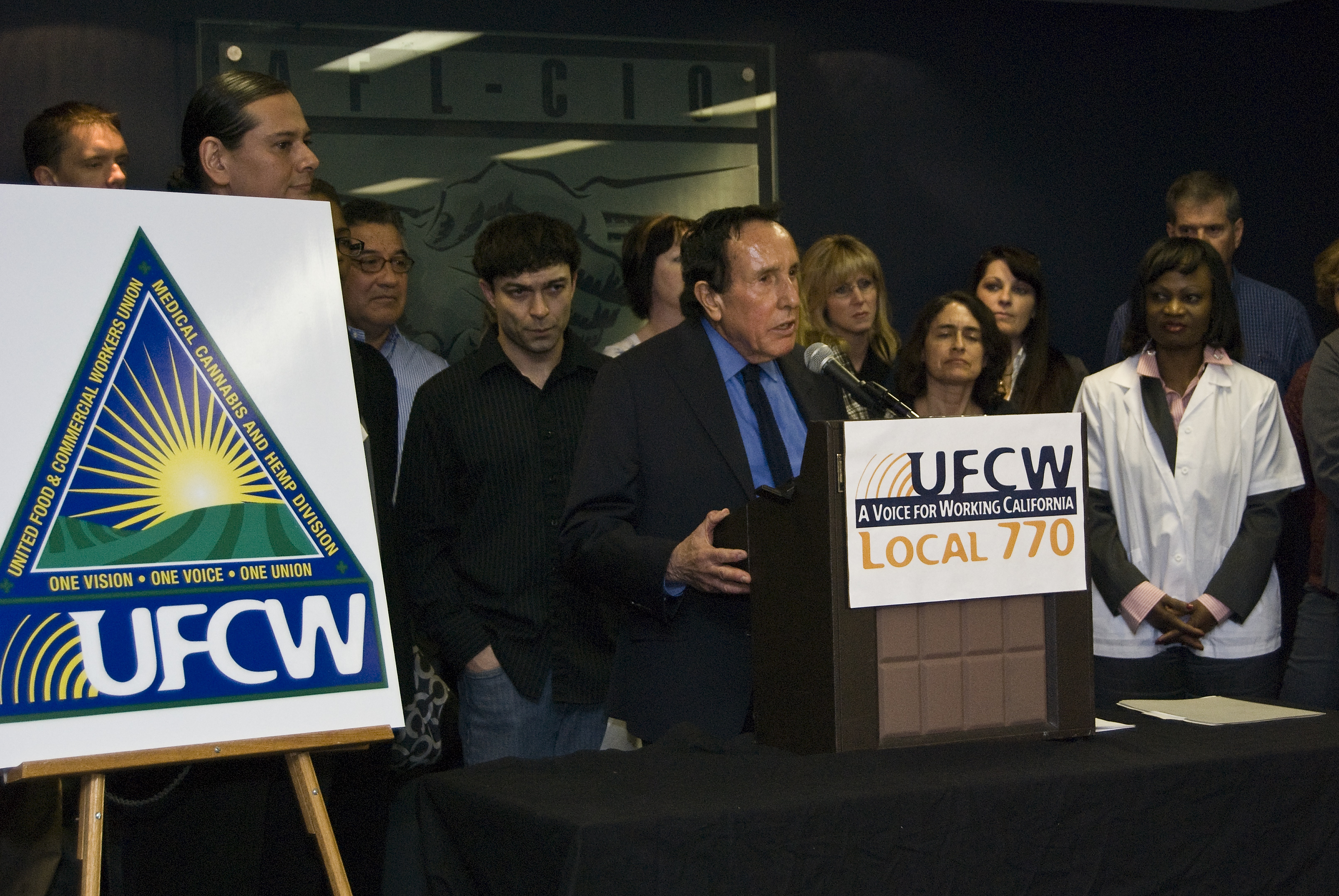
Medical marijuana workers division being welcomed into the UFCW, 2012.

The cannabis industry was originally targeted for union organizing by UFCW Local 5 special operations director Dan Rush in 2010. After some initial success, Rush has since been serving federal prison time for cheating the union for personal gain by taking bribes from employers, and both the local and international unions have disowned him.

In 2010, Rush brokered a deal in which some California medical-marijuana business owners voted to become UFCW Local 5 members, in return for union endorsement of marijuana law reform. Recognized shops in Oakland included Richard Lee's Oaksterdam University, Oaksterdam Gift Shop, Blue Sky Coffee Shop/Dispensary, and the Bulldog Coffee Shop; and AMCD Dispensaries Inc, and the Patient ID Center. Soon after, the workers at Medi-Cone Farms of California joined the union. Between May 2010 and June 2011, more California business owners signed a neutrality agreement with UFCW, including Humboldt Bay Wellness Center and 707 Cannabis College in the Emerald Triangle of the California north coast. The international union realized that the industry consisted of the union's core industries, retail pharmacy and healthcare, agriculture, food processing and textiles-with hemp.

Few of these Top-Down Recognitions or Neutrality Agreements resulted in competitive contracts for cannabis workers in California. Only a handful of dispensaries in California have dues-paying members.

On 17 September 2015, the office of the United States Attorney for the Northern District of California announced that a federal grand jury had indicted Rush on a variety of counts on the basis of his cannabis-related union activities. He pled guilty in 2017 and served 37 months in federal prison.

In 2024, UFCW cannabis delivery drivers threatened to strike against Eaze, a California cannabis delivery company. The union reached a tentative agreement with Eaze, which included higher pay, better rules for vehicle reimbursement, and working conditions.

== Work stoppages and conflict with corporations ==
=== 2003 California grocery strike ===
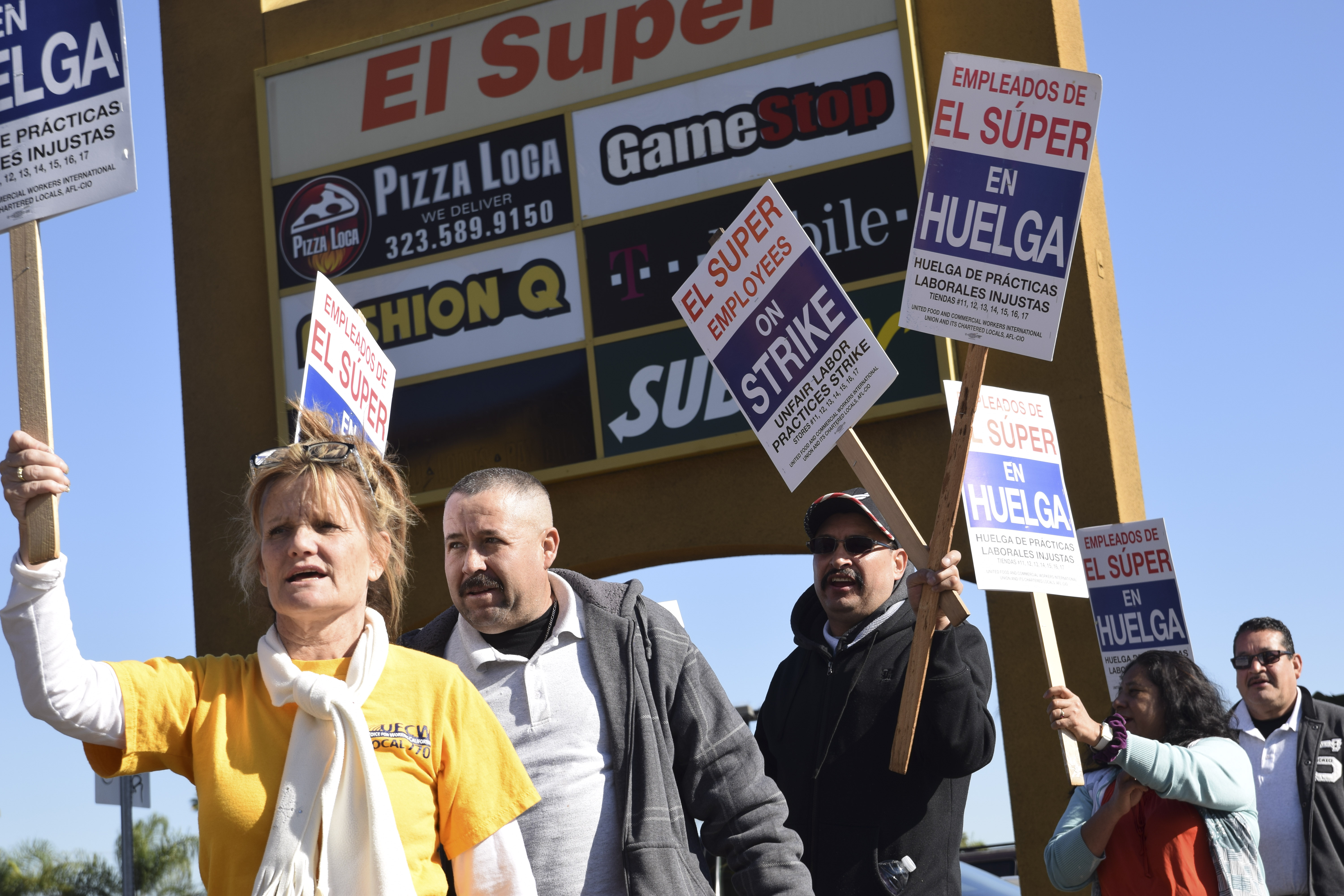
UFCW union grocery workers strike at supermarket center, 2015.

On October 11, 2003, the UFCW declared a strike on Vons (owned by Safeway Inc.), in Southern California, because of company-proposed changes to the new labor contract. These changes included cuts in health care and pension benefits, and the creation of a two-tier system in which new workers would be paid on a different schedule than existing workers. These changes were proposed due to competition from non-union retailers like Walmart. The day following the strike, Albertsons and Ralphs, owned by Kroger, locked out their Southern California employees.

The strike ended on February 26, 2004, when the UFCW and affected companies reached an agreement on a new contract. Union employees voted to end the strike, and many employees cited financial difficulties as a reason for ratifying the agreement. The new labor contract included concessions granted by the chains relating to current employee benefits and wages, and concessions granted by the union relating to creating two tiers of employees and cutting benefits overall.

=== Smithfield Foods ===
During the 1990s and 2000s, the UFCW was embroiled in a dispute with non-unionized meat processing company Smithfield Foods. The UFCW had repeatedly attempted to organize the company's Bladen County, North Carolina, meat-packing plant, but Smithfield Foods resisted this organizing. In 2007, Smithfield filed a federal lawsuit against the UFCW citing the Racketeer Influenced and Corrupt Organizations Act (RICO), claiming that the union orchestrated a public smear campaign to hurt Smithfield's business as a method of extorting the company. In the media, a Smithfield official cited the lawsuit as necessary by claiming that the company was "under attack," while union officials responded by calling the lawsuit an "attack on democracy and free speech." In October 2008, the UFCW and Smithfield reached an agreement, under which the union agreed to suspend its boycott campaign in return for the company dropping its RICO lawsuit and allowing another election. On December 10 and 11, workers at the plant voted 2,041 to 1,879 in favor of joining the UFCW, bringing the 15-year fight to an end.

=== Walmart ===
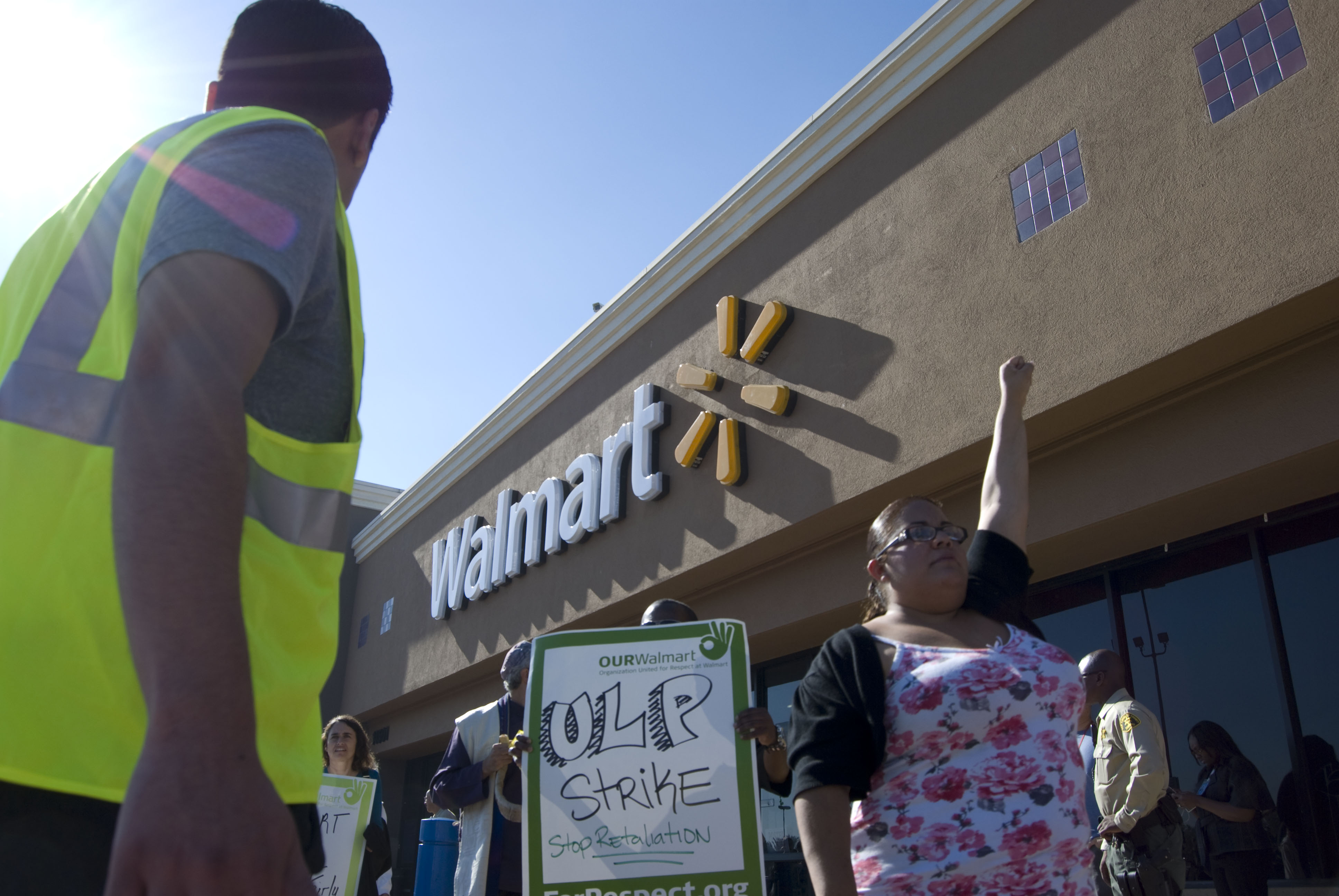
UFCW union activists and workers attempt to organize Walmart, 2012.

Walmart, a non-unionized company, has repeatedly been accused by the UFCW of treating its workers poorly and driving down employment standards. The UFCW has repeatedly attempted to organize the chain, but these attempts have been unsuccessful in the United States.

In Canada, the UFCW managed to win union recognition at two Walmart stores in Quebec and one in Saskatchewan. Walmart closed the Jonquière store and workers in Saint-Hyacinthe voted to decertify UFCW in 2011. The union has also applied for recognition at a dozen other Walmarts and had won a contract with a Walmart store in Gatineau, Quebec, Canada. After a couple years of unsuccessful negotiations between the union and Walmart the workers at the store decided to leave the union. The last remaining unionized Walmart in North America was located in Weyburn, Saskatchewan. Walmart successfully repelled an attempted UFCW unionization campaign there in August 2013 when the Supreme Court of Canada dismissed the union's attempt to compel Walmart to reach a collective agreement with it; workers at the Weyburn store then voted 51 to 5 to decertify the union.

In April 2005, as part of a volley of accusatory websites created by Walmart and the UFCW, the union created Wake Up Walmart, a US-based website and campaign with the stated goal of reforming Walmart's business practices.

=== Bashas' ===
In 2007, Bashas' filed a lawsuit against UFCW with the Supreme Court of Arizona. The lawsuit accused the UFCW and the union's operatives - including its "false-front" organization, "Hungry for Respect" - of defamation and intentionally interfering with the grocer's operations to extort an agreement for union representation. The company also named Radio Campesina (a project of the United Farm Workers Union founded by Cesar Chavez), Councilman Michael Nowakosky, and Reverend Trina Zelle as defendants.

=== Jim Beam ===
In October 2016, about 250 workers for Beam Suntory (the producer of the whiskey bourbon brand Jim Beam) went on strike over long working hours and the hiring of temporary workers in lieu of permanent full-time workers at two distillery facilities in Kentucky. The strike ended after about a week with a new labor contract that included a cap on the number of temporary workers and a commitment from the company to hire more full-time employees.

=== Stop & Shop ===
The 2019 Stop & Shop strike began on April 11, 2019, when approximately 31,000 workers, represented by the UFCW, walked off the job and began picketing Stop & Shop locations in the states of Massachusetts, Rhode Island, and Connecticut. The strike was in response to the company not agreeing, after extensive negotiations, to a contract which did not reduce employee pay and benefits. The strike ended eleven days later on April 21. The tentative agreement preserved health and pension benefits and raised employee pay.

=== Heaven Hill ===
In September 2021, about 420 members of UFCW Local 23D went on strike at the Heaven Hill bourbon distillery in Bardstown, Kentucky.

== Political activities ==
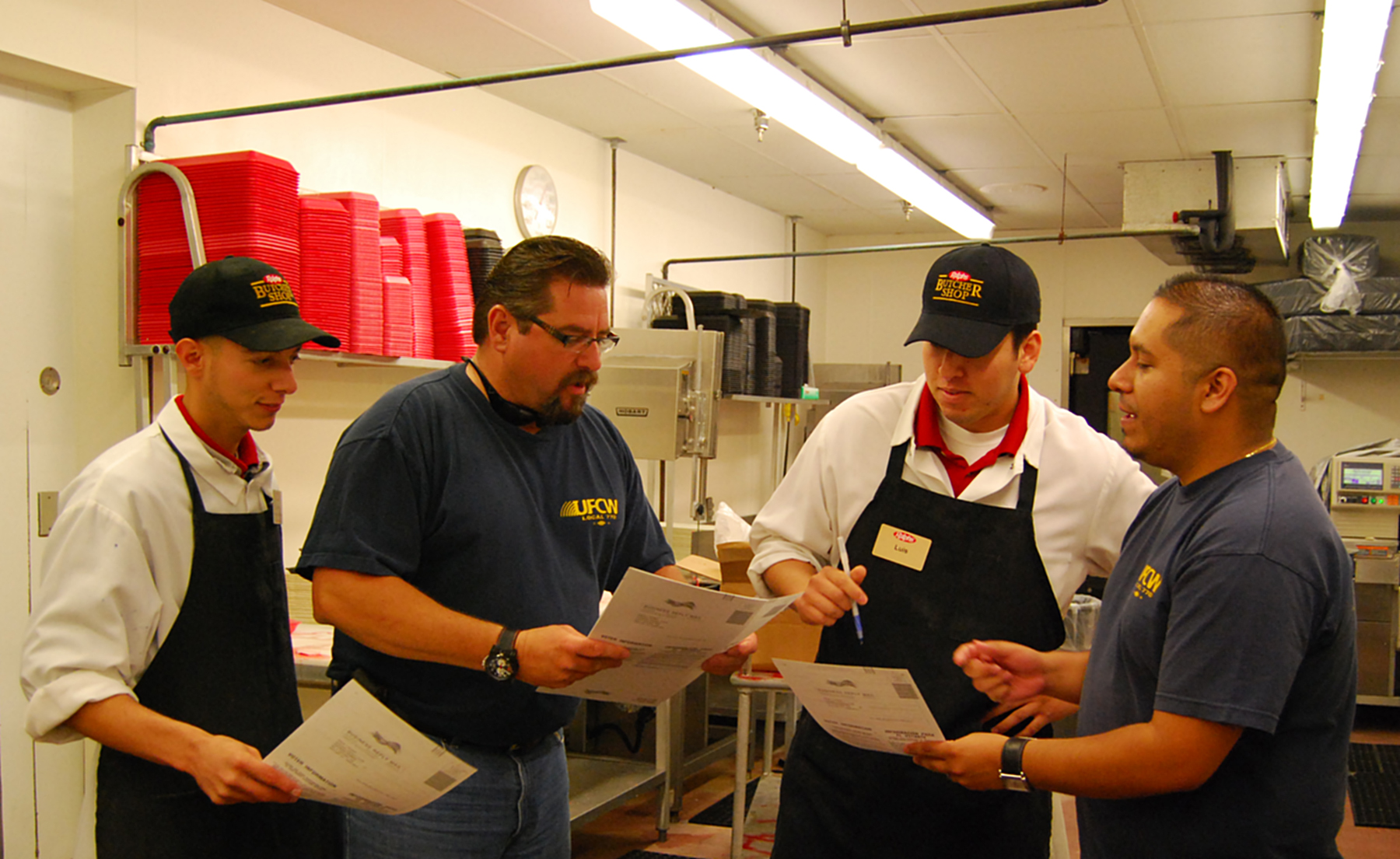
UFCW steward registering union members to vote, 2010

In the United States, the UFCW's political action committee spent $13,440,000 in the 2022 election cycle, 100 percent of which went to Democratic candidates.

== International leadership ==
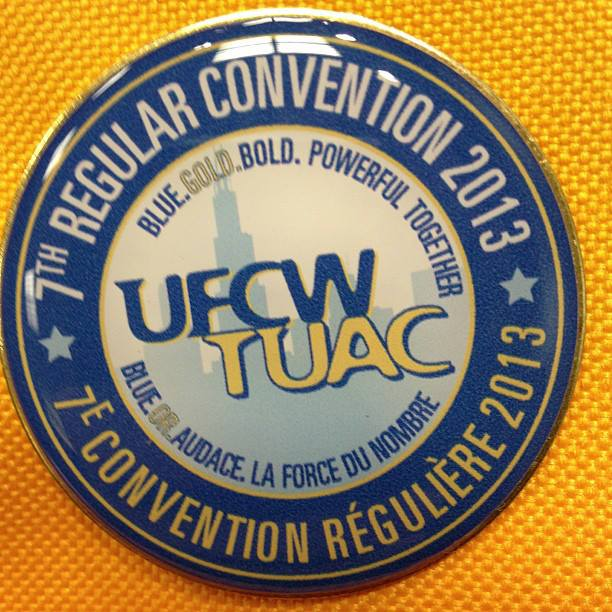
Pin from the 2013 UFCW International Convention

The International Presidents of the United Food and Commercial Workers are:

- William H. Wynn, 1979–1994
- Douglas H. Dority, 1994–2004
- Joseph T. Hansen, 2004–2014
- Marc Perrone, 2014–2025
- Milton Jones, 2025–present

In leading the union, the International President is supported by the International Executive Committee, which, in addition to the president, includes the International Secretary-Treasurer, and the union's three International Executive Vice-Presidents, one of whom historically includes the Canadian Director.

The International Secretary-Treasurers of the United Food and Commercial Workers are:

- Samuel J. Talarico, 1979–1982
- Anthony J. Lutty, 1981–1986
- Gerald Robert “Jerry” Menapace, 1986–1995
- Joseph C. Talarico, 1995–1997
- Joseph T. Hansen, 1997–2004
- Marc Perrone, 2004–2014
- Patrick J. O'Neill, 2014–2016
- Esther Lopez, 2016–2019
- Shaun Barclay, 2019–2023
- Milton Jones, 2023–2025
- Shawn Haggerty, 2025–present

The International Executive Committee is a subcommittee of the International Executive Board, which is the union's highest decision making authority between regular conventions. The International Executive Board consists of the members of the International Executive Committee plus 50 International Vice Presidents, all of whom are elected by regular UFCW international conventions.

== Canadian Director ==
The UFCW Canadian Director (also known as the National Director and, more recently, the UFCW Canada National President) is the union's ranking official based in Canada.

The UFCW Canada National President is elected by Canadian delegates to UFCW regular conventions.

As part of his or her duties, the UFCW Canada National President serves as the union's chief spokesperson in Canada, presides over the UFCW Canada national council, and represents the union on the CLC Canadian council.

The UFCW Canada National President also leads the efforts of the UFCW Canada national office, which involve field staff in every Canadian province, as well as dedicated resources and staff for communications, training and education, political and legislative affairs, and special projects.

The UFCW Canada National President also serves on the UFCW International Executive Committee as one of the union's three International Executive Vice Presidents.

The Canadian Directors of the United Food and Commercial Workers are:

- Clifford R. Evans, 1988–1992
- Thomas Kukovica, 1992–1999
- Michael J. Fraser, 1999–2006
- Wayne E. Hanley, 2006–2013
- Paul R. Meinema, 2013–2024
- Shawn Haggerty, 2024–2026
- Barry Sawyer, 2026–Present

Prior to 1988, the UFCW's efforts in Canada were co-directed by the director of region 18 and the director of region 19.

Region 18 included the former members of the Amalgamated Meat Cutters, and its directors were Romeo Mathieu (1979–1983), Frank Benn (1983–1986), and Willard "Bill" Hanley (1986–1988).

Region 19 included the former members of the Retail Clerks Union, and its director was Clifford R. Evans (1979–1988).

== Landrum–Griffin Act violations ==
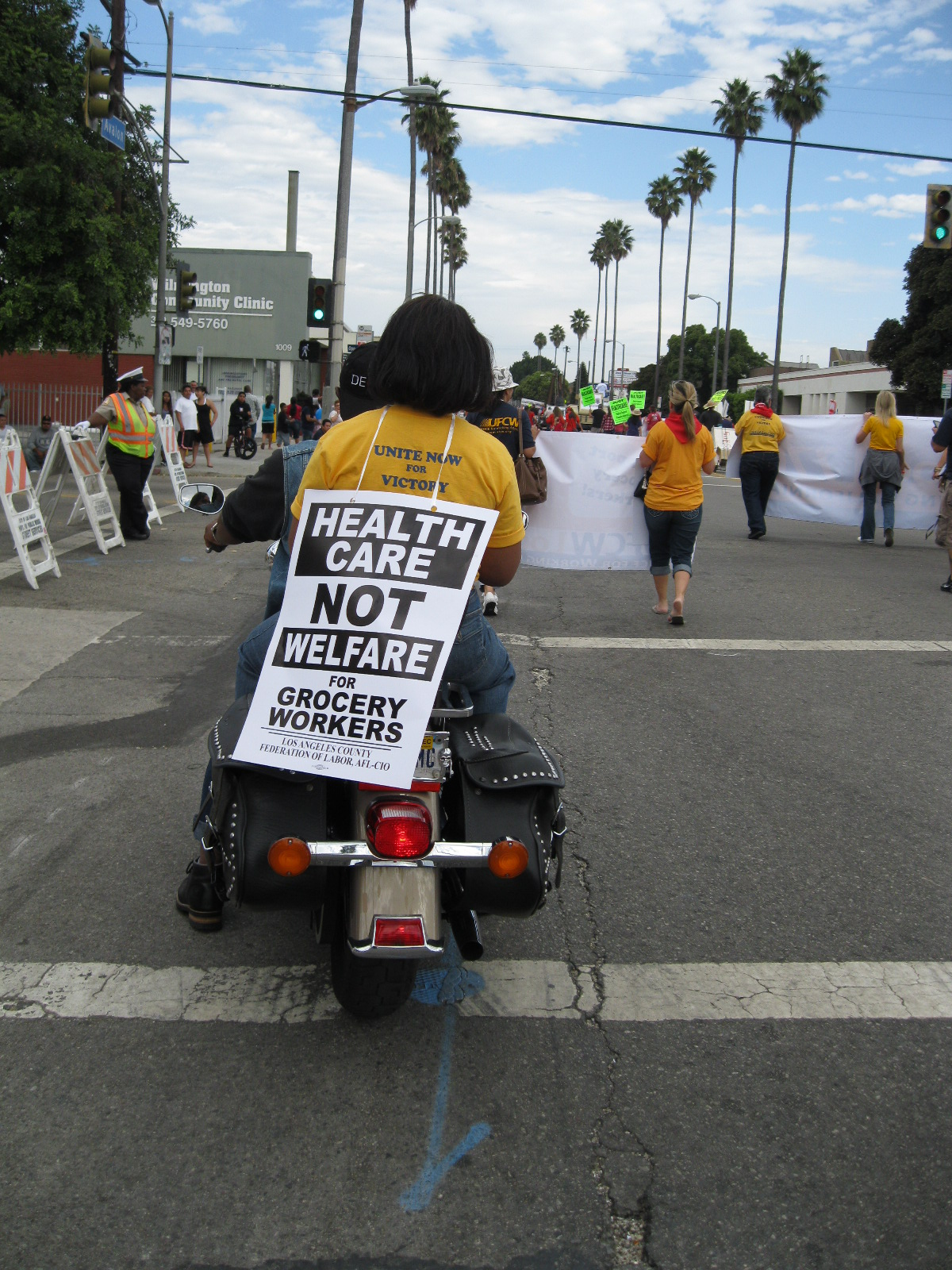
UFCW union members rally for healthcare, 2011.

The Labor Management Reporting and Disclosure Act of 1959 (also "LMRDA" or the "Landrum-Griffin Act"), is a United States labor law that regulates labor unions' internal affairs and their officials' relationships with employers.

On October 22, 2013, the Office of Labor-Management Standards (OLMS) of the United States Department of Labor accepted a voluntary compliance agreement with United Food and Commercial Workers (UFCW) Local 5 (located in San Jose, Calif.), concerning the challenged election of officers conducted on September 4, 2012, as well as the March 22, 2013 re-run election ordered by the International union. The union agreed to conduct a new election, including new nominations, for the offices of president, secretary-treasurer, recorder, and vice-presidents 1 through 31 under OLMS supervision. The investigation of the challenged election disclosed that union resources were used when the UFCW International President sent a campaign letter to various UFCW officers soliciting contributions and his executive assistant obtained the recipients’ addresses while on union time. The agreement follows an investigation by the OLMS San Francisco-Seattle District Office.

A UFCW member in Southern California filed a complaint in 2013 with the OLMS against former UFCW 1036 Trustees for illegally transferring $100,000 from the local union (1036) to UFCW International in a violation of Section 303 of the LMRDA.

A statement reported: "The investigation disclosed that on February 26, 2009, the trustee (Shaun Barclay) appointed by the International (UFCW) to manage the affairs of the local (1036) transferred $100,000 of the local's monies to the International...The (UFCW) International... agreed that the transfer was unlawful and should not have occurred". Funds were returned to the appropriate local unions, following the investigation by the Department of Labor, Office of Labor-Management Standards.

== See also ==
- 1984 Marval turkey strike
- Impact of the COVID-19 pandemic on the meat industry in the United States
- UFCW Local 832, Winnipeg
- UFCW Local 1776, Philadelphia
- Workers' rights in meat packing industry
