= Clifford R. Evans =

Canadian trade unionist (1937–2018)

Clifford R. Evans OOnt
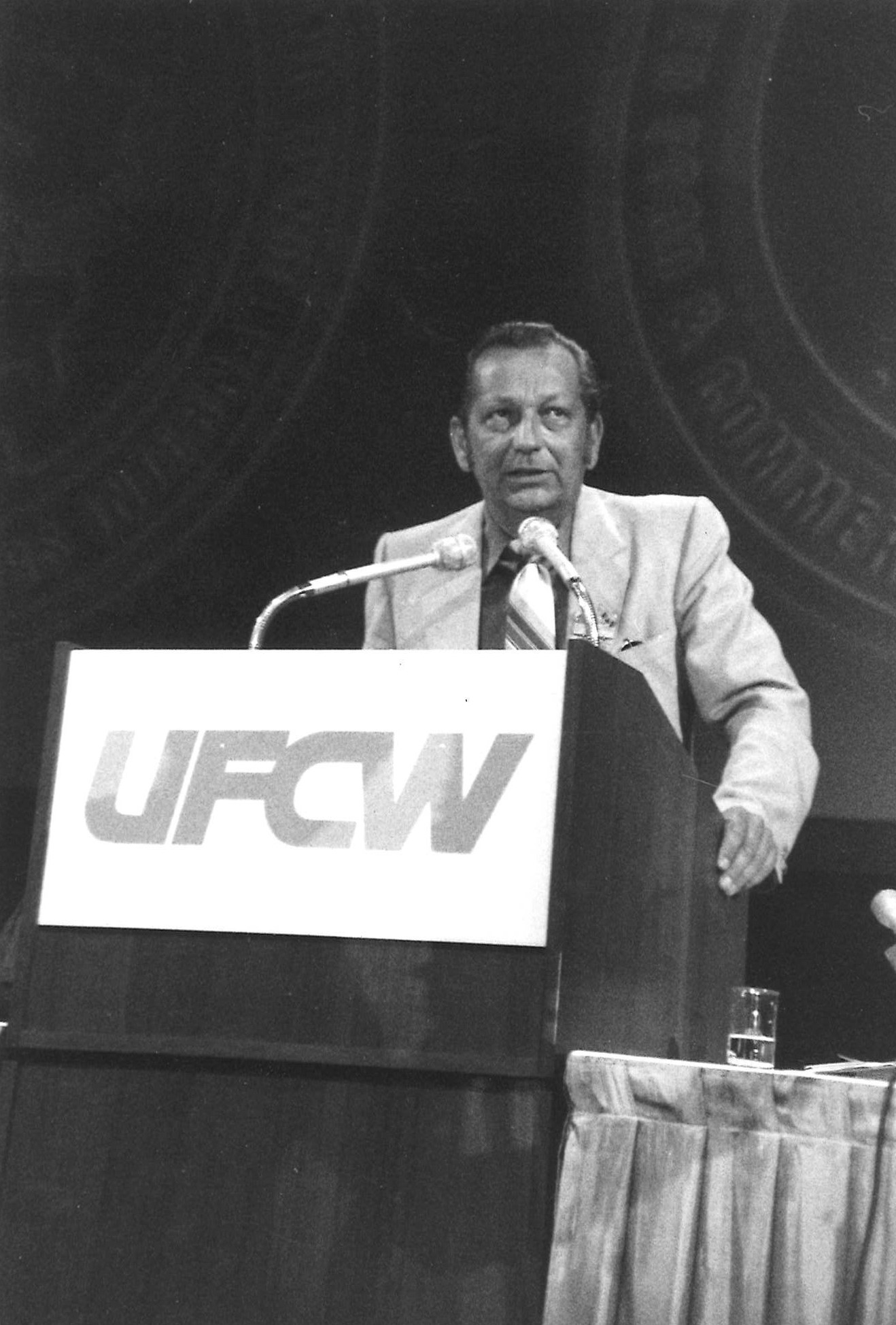

1st Canadian Director of the United Food and Commercial Workers
- In office 1988–1992
- President: William H. Wynn
- Preceded by: Position established
- Succeeded by: Thomas Kukovica

International Vice President of the United Food and Commercial Workers – Canadian Director of Region 19
- In office 1979–1988
- President: William H. Wynn
- Preceded by: Position established
- Succeeded by: Position dissolved

1st Canadian Director of the Retail Clerks International Union
- In office 1970–1979
- President: James Housewright; William H. Wynn
- Preceded by: Position established
- Succeeded by: Position dissolved

Personal details
- Born: June 23, 1937 Guelph, Ontario, Canada
- Died: February 14, 2018 (aged 80) Buffalo, New York, U.S.
- Party: New Democratic Party
- Occupation: Grocery retail clerk, trade unionist

Clifford Russel Evans, OOnt (June 23, 1937 – February 14, 2018) was a Canadian trade unionist, pension plan innovator, and a key player in the creation of the United Food and Commercial Workers International Union.

== Early life ==
Evans was born in Guelph, Ontario, Canada, on June 23, 1937.

== Activism and career ==
Evans became a member of the Retail Clerks International Union (RCIU) in 1957 when he organized the workers at the Dominion Store in Guelph, Ontario, where he was employed.

That same year he was elected vice president of RCIU Local 206, and two months later, at the age of 19, he became its full-time secretary treasurer.

In 1960, he was appointed international representative for the RCIU, focused on southern Ontario, and in 1969 he returned to Local 206 to become its president.

In 1970, the Canadian region of the RCIU was created with Evans elected as the union's first Canadian director.

When the RCIU merged with the Amalgamated Meat Cutters and Butcher Workmen of North America in 1979 to create the UFCW, Cliff was elected director of region 19, and an international vice president, at the new union's founding convention.

As director of region 19, Evans set a new standard for worker organizing in Canada, scaling the region's total membership from 5,000 in 1957 to 65,000 in 1986.

Evans also led UFCW through one of the largest union battles in Canadian history, which took place during the 1980s and involved the Canadian Auto Workers raiding more than 25,000 UFCW members in Newfoundland who worked as fisherman.

In 1988, regions 18 and 19 of the union merged to create the UFCW Canadian council and a singular national office, and Evans was elected the union's first director representing the entire Canadian membership.

Evans served as the UFCW Canadian director until his retirement in 1992.

== Awards ==
Evans was awarded the Order of Ontario in 1996 for his commitment to workers and, in particular, his role in creating the Canadian Commercial Workers Industry Pension Plan, which, since its founding, has become Canada's largest multi-employer pension plan with more than $2.3 billion in assets, 275,000 members, and 180 participating employers.
