= Ken Georgetti =

Canadian trade unionist (born 1952)

Ken Georgetti CM OBC
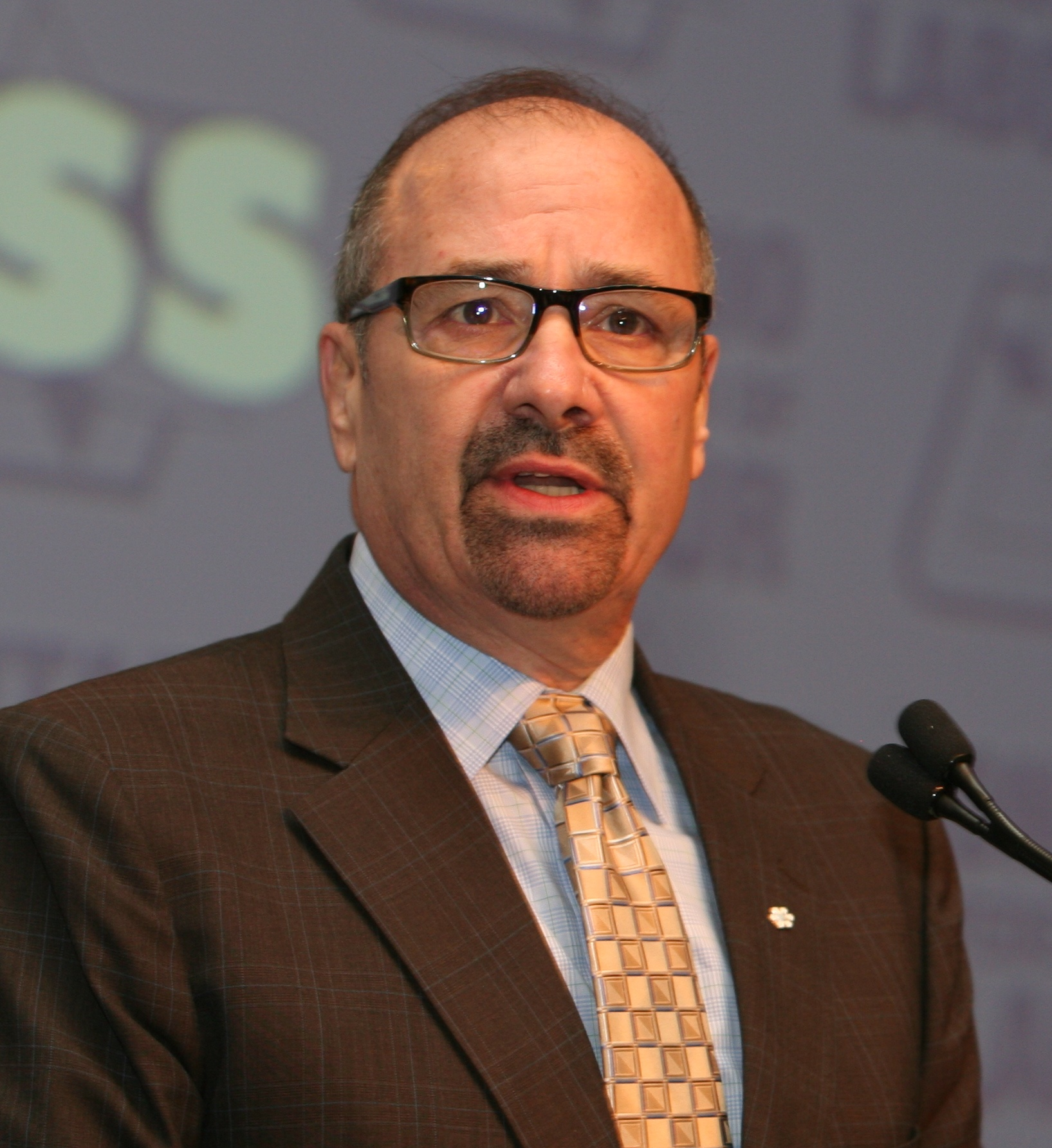
- Georgetti addressing the 2013 Ontario Federation of Labour convention

7th President of the Canadian Labour Congress
- In office 1999–2014
- Preceded by: Bob White
- Succeeded by: Hassan Yussuff

President of the British Columbia Federation of Labour
- In office 1986–1999

Personal details
- Born: 1952 (age 73–74) Trail, British Columbia
- Party: New Democratic Party
- Occupation: Pipefitter, trade unionist

Kenneth V. Georgetti CM OBC (born 1952) is a Canadian labour leader. Georgetti served as president of the Canadian Labour Congress (CLC) from 1999 to 2014. Prior to this, Georgetti served as president of the British Columbia Federation of Labour, and was the youngest person to hold the role.

== Trade union career ==
Georgetti arrived at the head of the Canadian Labour Congress after a quarter century of union activism in British Columbia, home to Canada's most polarized politics and of a vibrant labour movement. Born in Trail, in the southern interior of the province, Georgetti first went to work in the giant Cominco smelter, just like his father. He worked in most areas of the smelter and earned his trade ticket as a pipefitter. Following the family tradition, Georgetti became active in the United Steelworkers of America Local 480, rising through the ranks to become president of the Local in 1981.

Elected vice-president of the British Columbia Federation of Labour in 1984, he became its youngest-ever president two years later. At the same time, he broadened his national labour involvement by becoming a provincial vice-president of the CLC.

== Strategies ==
Georgetti has long advocated what he describes as "intelligent militancy". This proactive approach makes use of a wide range of strategies and tactics to achieve labour's goals. For example, as B.C. Fed President, Georgetti in 1987 led unionized workers in British Columbia in the largest one-day general strike in Canadian history, followed by a successful five-year boycott to protest labour laws and institutions established by the then Social Credit Party of British Columbia government.

== CLC goals ==
Georgetti's priorities as the leadership of the Canadian Labour Congress included the campaign to double the Canada Pension Plan benefits, defence and strengthening of public medicare, organizing greater numbers of workers, providing lifelong learning opportunities, enhancing youth's involvement in unions, increasing literacy levels for all Canadians and combating child labour. Promotion of labour rights and protection of employment standards in an increasingly globalized economy, and international development that respects workers' and human rights, are also key priorities. Under Georgetti's leadership, the CLC has spearheaded worldwide campaigns against corporate globalization, sweatshop manufacturers and the use of child and forced labour.

Georgetti were also involved in international issues, continuing a long CLC tradition. He served as a vice-president and member of the executive board of the International Confederation of Free Trade Unions before it merged with World Confederation of Labour, and was a member of its Human and Workers' Rights Committee. He is currently a vice-president and member of the executive board of the International Trade Union Confederation (ITUC), and the chair of the ITUC Committee on Workers' Capital. He is also an executive member of the Trade Union Advisory Committee to the Organisation for Economic Co-operation and Development (OECD).

== Awards ==
Georgetti has been recognized by various levels of government for his contributions to labour relations and the overall well-being of Canadian society. In 1998, he became the first union leader to be appointed to the distinguished Order of British Columbia. In 2000, he was made a Member of the Order of Canada – only the tenth labour leader to be so honoured.

Trade union offices
Preceded by Bob White	President of the Canadian Labour Congress; 1999–2014	Succeeded by Hassan Yussuff
