= James Housewright =

American labor union leader (1921–1977)

James Talbertt Housewright

7th International President of the Retail Clerks International Union
- In office 1968–1977
- Preceded by: James Suffridge
- Succeeded by: William H. Wynn

Personal details
- Born: Wesco, Missouri, U.S.

James Talbertt Housewright (November 23, 1921 – September 19, 1977) was an American labor union leader.

Born in Wesco, Missouri, Housewright grew up in Indiana. He joined the Retail Clerks International Union in 1947, and soon became secretary-treasurer of its Local 725, based in Indianapolis. He became a full-time representative of the union in 1953, a division director the following year, then director of organization, and executive assistant to the president. In 1968, he was elected as the union's president, one of the youngest leaders of a major labor union. Under his leadership, the union's membership doubled.

Housewright also became a vice-president of the AFL-CIO. In this role, he led the formation of a new Food and Beverage Trades Department, to improve working relationships between the various unions in the industry. He became the first president of the new department, and in that role, began negotiating a merger between his union, the Retail Clerks International Union, and the Amalgamated Meat Cutters and Butcher Workmen of North America. However, he died in 1977, before any merger could be agreed.

Trade union offices
| Preceded by James Suffridge | President of the Retail Clerks International Union; 1968–1977 | Succeeded by William H. Wynn |
| Preceded by Peter Bommarito; Martin Ward | AFL-CIO delegate to the Trades Union Congress; 1974; With: Max Greenberg | Succeeded by William Sidell; Sol Stetin |
