= Hassan Yussuff =

Canadian senator and labour leader (born 1957)

The Honourable Hassan Yussuff
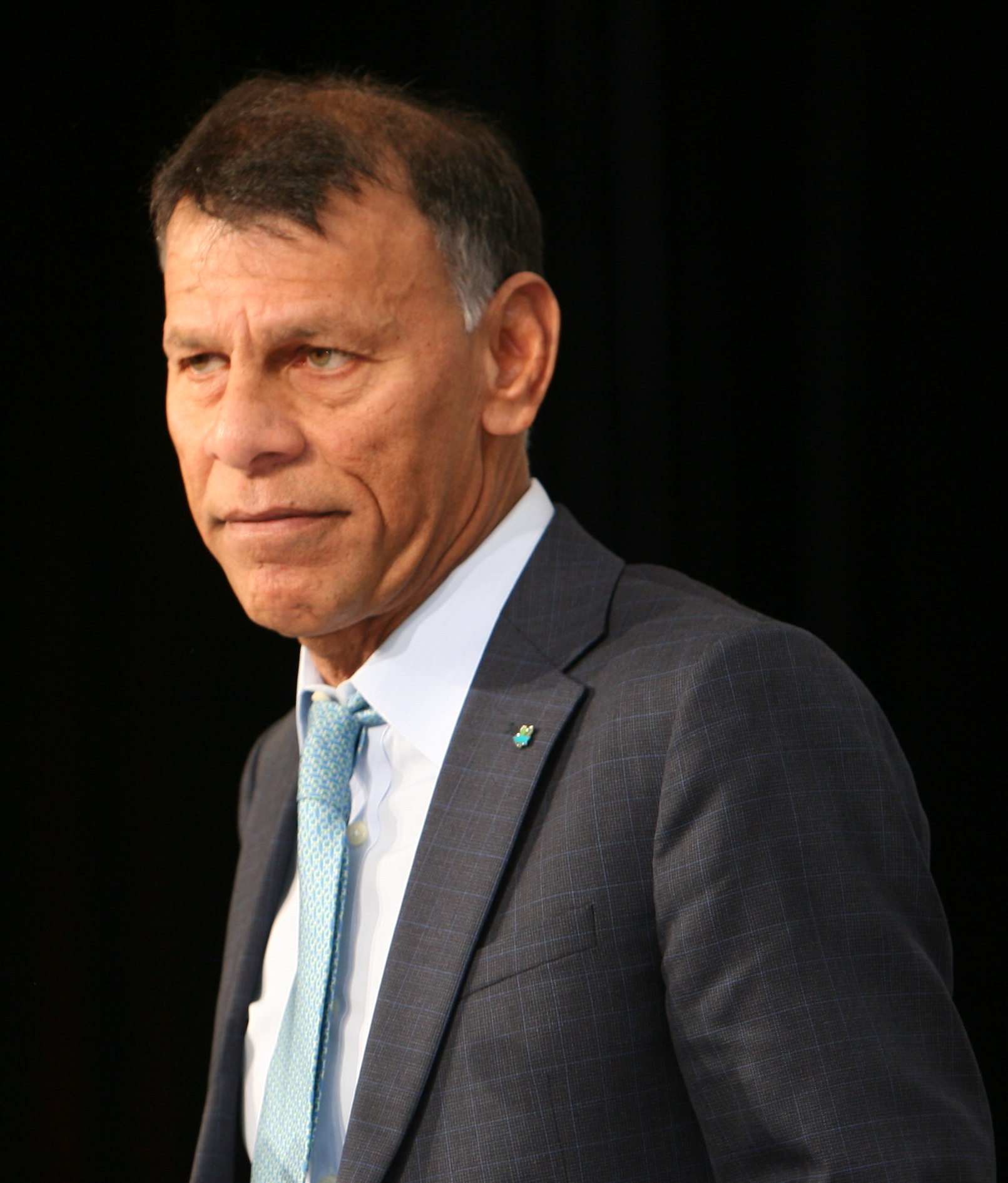
- Yussuff in 2017

Canadian Senator from Ontario
- Incumbent
- Assumed office June 22, 2021
- Nominated by: Justin Trudeau
- Appointed by: Richard Wagner
- Preceded by: Lynn Beyak

8th President of the Canadian Labour Congress
- In office 2014 – June 18, 2021
- Preceded by: Ken Georgetti
- Succeeded by: Bea Bruske

2nd President of the Trade Union Confederation of the Americas
- In office April 20, 2012 – 2021
- Preceded by: Linda Chavez-Thompson
- Succeeded by: Fred Redmond

Secretary-Treasurer of the Canadian Labour Congress
- In office 2002–2014

Personal details
- Born: December 15, 1957 (age 68) Guyana
- Party: Independent
- Children: 1
- Occupation: Politician; labour leader; heavy truck mechanic; trade unionist

Hassan Yussuff (born December 15, 1957) is a Canadian labour leader and politician. From 2014 to 2021, Yussuff served as president of the Canadian Labour Congress (CLC), the first visible minority person to hold the role. In 2021, Yussuff was appointed by Prime Minister Justin Trudeau to serve as Canadian Senator from Ontario.

== Early life ==
Yussuff emigrated to Canada from Guyana as a young man to work as a heavy truck mechanic. Once he arrived in Toronto, Yussuff soon found employment on the plant floor of CanCar, a local automotive parts manufacturer.

== Career ==
=== Canadian Auto Workers ===
Yussuff first became a member of the Canadian Auto Workers (CAW) union while at CanCar. Within a year, he was elected plant chairman of Local 252 of the Canadian Auto Workers at the age of 19.

=== Canadian Labor Congress ===
Yussuff's position led to him joining the CLC's Executive Council, where he co-chaired the CLC Human Rights Committee. In 1999, Yussuff was elected Executive Vice-President of the CLC. In 2002, Yussuff was elevated to the position of Secretary-Treasury within the CLC, serving for twelve years. On April 20, 2012, Yussuff was elected to a four-year term as President of the Trade Union Confederation of the Americas.

He remained in that position until 2014, when he challenged incumbent CLC President Ken Georgetti, defeating him by 40 votes at the CLC's May 2014 convention to become CLC president. In doing so, he became first person to unseat an incumbent CLC president and the first non-white Canadian to hold the role.

Yussuff's presidency was characterized by a rift among the leadership of the CLC between NDP-loyalists and those who favoured widening the support to include the Liberal Party where appropriate. This reflected Yussuff's personal beliefs, and those of then-president of UNIFOR, Jerry Dias. Unable to reconcile his differences with the CLC on a number of issues, including on UNIFOR's decision to begin raiding other affiliates of the Congress, Dias pulled UNIFOR out of the CLC and disaffiliated, leaving Yussuff, elected from the delegates of UNIFOR, ineligible to remain in the role. He was given a special membership by one of the affiliates to permit him to carry out the remainder of his term, and on June 18, 2021, Yussuff retired from office, and was replaced by Bea Bruske.

Yussuff's presidency saw the CLC make several important inroads on important issues it had campaigned for, in some cases, for decades. Notably, Yussuff's leadership was characterized by "Town Hall"-style campaign events, where he travelled across Canada holding events on various topic of importance, often with experts or scholars on the topic joining him on the stage. The CLC commissioned several studies and pushed for an expansion of the Canada Pension Plan (CPP) and an introduction of Pharmacare, a public single-payer insurance system for medications. In 2016, the Liberal Government of Justin Trudeau announced it would make changes to the CPP, improving the plan beginning in 2019. Several years later, the government announced similar plans to implement dental care coverage on a means-tested basis and to phase-in pharmacare in the near future. All three were achievements Yussuff and the CLC were responsible for in large part.

== Political activity ==
Following the loss of the New Democratic Party (NDP) in the 2015 federal election, Yussuff supported replacing Tom Mulcair as party leader. In 2019, Yussuff voiced concern that the federal NDP was failing to resonate with both its membership and the general electorate.

Yussuff opposed the CLC's decision to affirm its relationship with the NDP at the 2021 convention, arguing the CLC should take a more pragmatic approach to party politics. In 2021, Yussuff co-wrote an op-ed with Perrin Beatty, CEO of the Canadian Chamber of Commerce, in support of the Canada Emergency Wage Subsidy for the Financial Post.

On June 22, 2021, Yussuff was appointed by Liberal Prime Minister Justin Trudeau to the Senate of Canada.

== Personal life ==
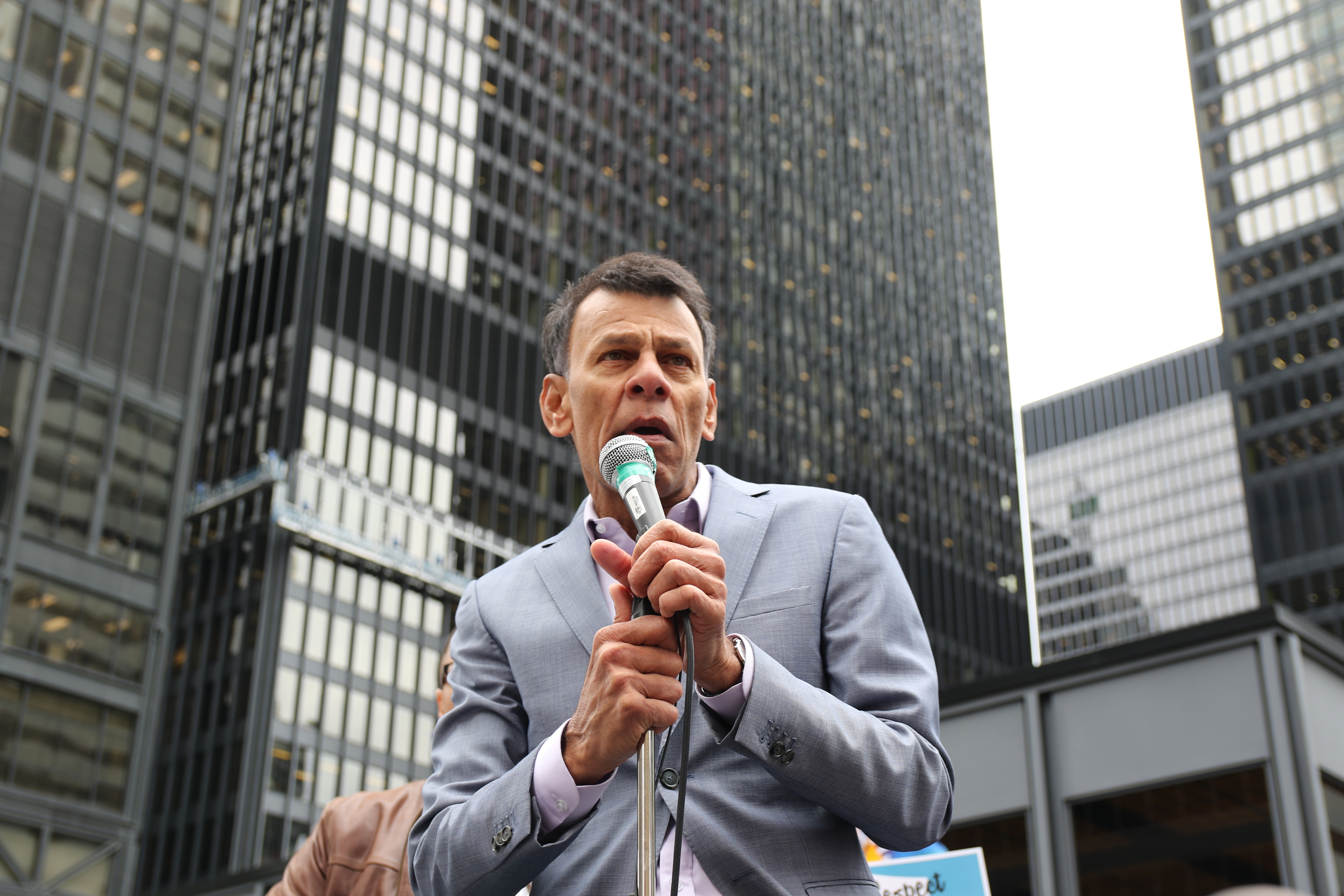
Yussuff at Street Party for a Fair Future, 2017

Yussuff is married to Jenny Ahn, who works as the Executive Director for Ontario Confederation of University Faculty Associations, with whom he has a daughter. In October 2018, Yussuff received an honorary Doctor of Laws degree from Ryerson University.

Preceded by Ken Georgetti	President of the Canadian Labour Congress; 2014–2021	Succeeded by Bea Bruske
