= Dennis McDermott =

Canadian trade unionist (1922 – 2003)

Dennis McDermott OOnt

Canadian Ambassador to Ireland
- In office 1986–1989
- Governor General: Jeanne Sauvé
- Prime Minister: Brian Mulroney
- Preceded by: Gustav Gad Rezek
- Succeeded by: Mike Wadsworth

4th President of the Canadian Labour Congress
- In office 1978–1986
- Preceded by: Joe Morris
- Succeeded by: Shirley Carr

3rd Canadian Director of the United Auto Workers
- In office 1968–1978
- President: Walter Reuther; Leonard Woodcock; Douglas Fraser
- Preceded by: George Burt
- Succeeded by: Bob White

Personal details
- Born: November 3, 1922 Portsmouth, England
- Died: February 13, 2003 (aged 80) Peterborough, Ontario
- Party: New Democratic Party
- Occupation: Welder, assembler, trade unionist

Dennis McDermott OOnt (November 3, 1922 – February 13, 2003) was a Canadian trade unionist who served as Canadian Director of the United Auto Workers from 1968 to 1978 and president of the Canadian Labour Congress from 1978 to 1986.

Born in Portsmouth, England, McDermott immigrated to Canada in 1948 and settled in Toronto where he worked as an assembler and welder at the Massey-Harris plant. He became a full-time organizer for the United Auto Workers in Canada (UAW) in 1954. He was elected Canadian Director of the UAW in 1968 and became an international vice-president of the union in 1970.

As leader of the Canadian UAW he also became a vice-president of the Canadian Labour Congress. He left the UAW in 1978 to become president of the CLC.

McDermott was a social activist and civil liberties advocate and joined the Joint Labour Committee to Combat Racial Intolerance soon after arriving in Canada working with the committee to lobby for the enactment of Ontario's first Human Rights Code. He would later serve on the executive of the Canadian Civil Liberties Association. He led the Canadian UAW to support the California grape boycott in the 1960s and 1970s.

As UAW Canadian Director, McDermott led a campaign against wage controls being implemented by the government of Pierre Trudeau in 1975. Under McDermott, the CLC organized a 100,000 person protest against the federal Liberal government's economic policies in 1981.

Following his term as CLC president, McDermott was appointed Canada's ambassador to Ireland in 1986 and served in that position until 1989.

McDermott was strong supporter of the New Democratic Party and organized the CLC to operate a political action program in support of the NDP in the 1979 federal election.

Preceded by Joe Morris	President of the Canadian Labour Congress; 1978–1986	Succeeded by Shirley Carr
Preceded by George Burt	Canadian Director of the United Auto Workers; 1968–1978	Succeeded by Bob White
