= Haruki Mori =

Japanese diplomat

Haruki Mori (森 治樹, Mori Haruki; 26 January 1911 – 19 August 1988) was a Japanese diplomat.

Following the reestablishment of diplomatic relations between the Japanese and the Italian governments in 1952, Mori was appointed counsellor of the embassy in Italy. In the late 1960s he served as vice-minister of foreign affairs, and in that capacity concluded the Japanese-OECD agreement that regulated OECD activities in Japan. In 1972, he was appointed ambassador to the United Kingdom, and in that capacity signed on behalf of Japan the Brussels Convention on the Establishment of an International Fund for Compensation for Oil Pollution Damage and the London Convention for the Conservation of Antarctic Seals. In 1977, he served as member of the Brandt Commission that was appointed under the chairmanship of former West German Prime Minister Willy Brandt to study world economic development.
