= Milton Jones (unionist) =

American trade union leader

5th International President of the United Food and Commercial Workers
- Preceded by: Marc Perrone
- In office 2025–present

Personal details
- Party: Democratic Party (United States)
- Occupation: Grocery retail clerk, trade unionist

Milton L. Jones is an American labor union leader.

Born in Florence, Alabama, Jones worked for Kroger as a teenager. He joined the United Food and Commercial Workers (UFCW), becoming a shop steward and volunteer organizer. He also spent four years in the United States Navy. He gradually rose to prominence in the union, becoming an executive vice president in 1990, and also serving as Director of National Bargaining.

In 2023, Jones was elected as secretary-treasurer of the UFCW, then in 2025 was appointed as president of the union. He also became a vice-president of the AFL-CIO.

Trade union offices
Preceded by Shaun Barclay	Secretary-Treasurer of the United Food and Commercial Workers; 2023–2025	Succeeded by Shawn Haggerty
Preceded by Marc Perrone	President of the United Food and Commercial Workers; 2025–present	Succeeded by Incumbent
