= Joe Morris (trade unionist) =

Canadian trade unionist (1913–1996)

Joe Morris CC

3rd President of the Canadian Labour Congress
- In office 1974–1978
- Preceded by: Donald MacDonald
- Succeeded by: Dennis McDermott

Executive Vice President of the Canadian Labour Congress
- In office 1962–1974
- President: Claude Jodoin; Donald MacDonald
- Preceded by: William Dodge; Stanley Knowles
- Succeeded by: Shirley Carr

Regional Vice President, Western Canada, of the International Woodworkers of America
- In office 1953–1962

Personal details
- Born: June 14, 1913 Lancashire, England
- Died: October 11, 1996 (aged 83) Victoria, British Columbia, Canada
- Spouse: Margaret Morris
- Occupation: Logger, trade unionist

Military service
- Allegiance: United Kingdom; Canada
- Branch/service: Canadian Army
- Rank: Lieutenant
- Battles/wars: World War II

Joseph Morris CC (14 June 1913 – 11 October 1996) was a Canadian trade unionist mostly noted as the president of the Canadian Labour Congress in the 1970s.

== Early life ==
Born in England, he immigrated to British Columbia in 1929 where he worked as a logger. He joined the trade union movement, first with a union of unemployed workers and then with the Lumber and Sawmill Workers Union in 1934. The union later joined the International Woodworkers of America (IWA) and he became a leader in the movement rising to the position of president of Local 1-80 in 1948. During World War II, Morris joined the Canadian Army and was given the commission of Lieutenant.

== IWA and CLC years ==
An anti-Communist in the union movement, Morris was active in opposing Communist Party activists in the IWA when he returned from serving in World War II and became the IWA's regional president for Western Canada in 1953. He left his IWA position in 1962 to become executive vice-president of the Canadian Labour Congress serving until 1974 when he became CLC president.

In 1976, he led the CLC in a national day of protest involving one million workers going on a one-day general strike against wage and price controls being implemented by the Liberal government of Pierre Trudeau.

He also served as vice-president of the International Confederation of Free Trade Unions in the 1970s and presided over two International Trade Union Conferences for Action Against Apartheid held in Geneva in 1973 and 1977.

In 1977, Morris was elected chairman of the governing body International Labour Organization, the first Canadian labour leader to hold the position. He retired as CLC president in 1978.

== Post CLC career ==
For his many years of national and international service to the labour movement, he was appointed an Officer of the Order of Canada on June 25, 1978. For his service in international human rights and labour circles, Morris was promoted, on June 25, 1984, to highest class of the Order of Canada: Companion. In later life he served on the Independent Commission on International Development Issues (the Brandt Commission) and on the boards of the Bank of Canada and the BC Ferries Corporation.

He had a heart attack on 8 October 1996, and died at the Royal Jubilee Hospital in Victoria, British Columbia on 11 October 1996.

== Reference and notes ==
Preceded by Donald MacDonald	President of the Canadian Labour Congress; 1974-1978	Succeeded by Dennis McDermott
