= Bob White (trade unionist) =

Canadian trade unionist (1935–2017)

Bob White OC

6th President of the Canadian Labour Congress
- In office 1992–1999
- Preceded by: Shirley Carr
- Succeeded by: Ken Georgetti

1st President of the Canadian Auto Workers
- In office 1985–1992
- Preceded by: new office
- Succeeded by: Buzz Hargrove

4th Canadian Director of the United Auto Workers
- In office 1978–1985
- Preceded by: Dennis McDermott
- Succeeded by: office abolished

Personal details
- Born: April 28, 1935 Upperlands, Northern Ireland
- Died: February 19, 2017 (aged 81) Kincardine, Ontario
- Occupation: Trade unionist

Robert White OC (April 28, 1935 – February 19, 2017) was a prominent leader in the Canadian trade union and labour movement who was the founding president of the Canadian Auto Workers (now Unifor) after leading its separation from its American parent, the United Auto Workers, and then president of the Canadian Labour Congress. Born in Northern Ireland, he emigrated with his family to Canada at age 13, settling in Woodstock, Ontario. White died in 2017 at the age of 81 in Kincardine, Ontario.

== Labour movement ==
White began working at age 15 (Hay & Company - a wood furniture maker owned by US Plywood) and within a year he had already participated in a strike, his first pro-labour activity, and was elected a union steward at the age of 17. He led his first strike, against the same company, in 1957 at the age of 22, leading 500 workers off the job. Subsequently, White became fully immersed in the Canadian labour movement as a union organizer and then by 1959 president of Local 636 of the United Auto Workers (U.A.W.), a union based in the United States, that at the time had a large membership in Canadian industry (particularly in automobile manufacturing). In 1960 White was appointed as international representative of the U.A.W. and assigned to organizing duties within Canada. In 1972, White became administrative assistant to the director of the National Office of the U.A.W. White succeeded Dennis McDermott as Canadian Director of the UAW in 1978.

In 1984, White encouraged the Canadian Membership of the U.A.W. to split away from the American union and form a new and separate entity, the Canadian Auto Workers Union (properly the National Automobile, Aerospace, Transportation and General Workers Union of Canada). An important event in the history of the Canadian labour movement, this split took place largely because the Canadian delegates to the U.A.W. conventions felt that they did not have a strength or voice at the American conventions. The schism and the formation of the C.A.W. as a separate entity was successful and White was acclaimed as the first leader of the fledgling union at the first C.A.W. convention in 1985.

== Political activism ==
White became a national figure in Canadian labour and politics during this time and was outspoken in his opposition to the then proposed Canada-U.S. Free Trade Agreement. White served 3 terms as president of the largest private labour organization in Canada before stepping aside from this position to become the president of the Canadian Labour Congress (CLC) in 1992. In his capacity as leader of the CLC, White represented the interests of 2.2 million Canadian workers and was always a strong advocate of social justice issues and fair trade practices, not only for Canadians but workers around the world.

White had been a vocal opponent of U.S. missile testing on Canadian soil and encouraged other world leaders to take a pro-active role against U.S. led military initiatives and continued to be an outspoken critic of international trade agreements that he argued failed to recognize basic human and labour rights.

== Honours and positions ==
He was awarded doctor of law degrees from York University, the University of Toronto, the University of Windsor, and St. Francis Xavier University. He was also inducted into the Order of Canada as an Officer for his exceptional service to the country.

White was an advocate for jobs, labour and human rights before several international forums including the G8 and the OECD (the organization of the 25 most industrial nations). White was the President of the Trade Union Advisory Committee (TUAC) of the Organisation for Economic Co-operation and Development (OECD). He was the first Canadian to hold the post. White was the chair of the Commonwealth Trade Union Council. White was also the chair of the Human and Trade Union Rights Committee of the 126 million-member International Confederation of Free Trade Unions, the largest trade union body in the world. In retirement, he served as President Emeritus of the CLC.

- Was a member of the Stadco. board, appointed by Bob Rae, as to help turn around SkyDome (Rogers Centre) in the early 1990s.
- The Grey Bruce Labour Council distributes a $1 500 dollar annual scholarship to five high school students from Grey County and Bruce County who demonstrate involvement in the promotion of activities that promote values of social justice in the betterment of their community.

== Books and films ==
- Bob White plays a major role in the 1985 documentary film Final Offer by Sturla Gunnarsson and Robert Collison. It shows the 1984 contract negotiations with General Motors that led to the CAW's birth and split from the UAW. It examines life on the shop floor of a car factory along with the art of collective bargaining.
