= Brandt Report =

1980 economic report

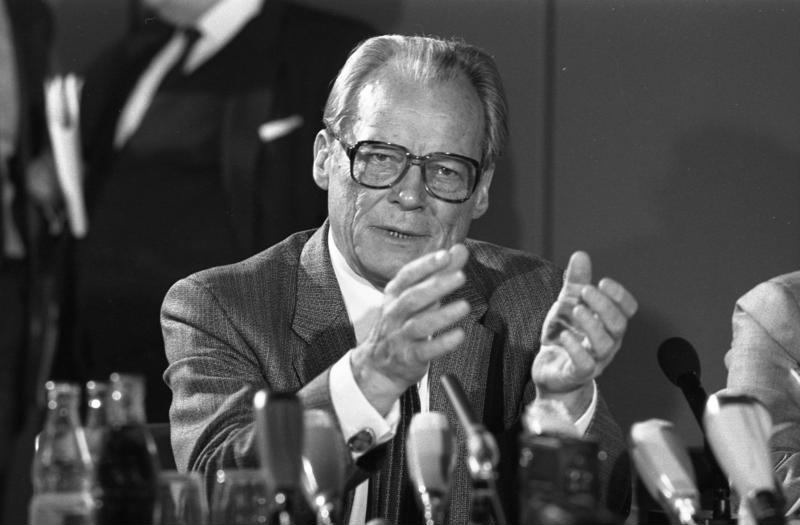
Willy Brandt in 1982, the creator of the Brandt Report

The Brandt Report is the first report of the Independent Commission on International Developmental Issues, chaired by Willy Brandt, published in 1980. The Independent Commission on International Developmental Issues was established in 1977 with the aim to review international development issues, with the former German Chancellor being selected as Head by Robert McNamara, then the World Bank President. The result of the 1980 report, followed by a second one in 1983, provided an understanding of drastic differences in the economic development of the Global North and Global South.

The Brandt Report suggests primarily that a great chasm in standard of living exists along the North–South divide and there should therefore be a large transfer of resources from developed to developing countries. The countries North of the divide are extremely wealthy due to their successful trade in manufactured goods, whereas the countries South of the divide suffer poverty due to their trade in intermediate goods, where the export incomes are low. The Brandt Commission envisaged a new global developmental initiative that would minimize inflation and unemployment in the North while facilitating growth in, and transferring resources to, the South. It built its arguments on a pluralist perspective that combined social, economic and political considerations alongside more traditional concerns about national and international security. Aside from Brandt, others who served as commissioners included Haruki Mori, Joe Morris, Olof Palme, Peter G. Peterson, and Shridath Ramphal.

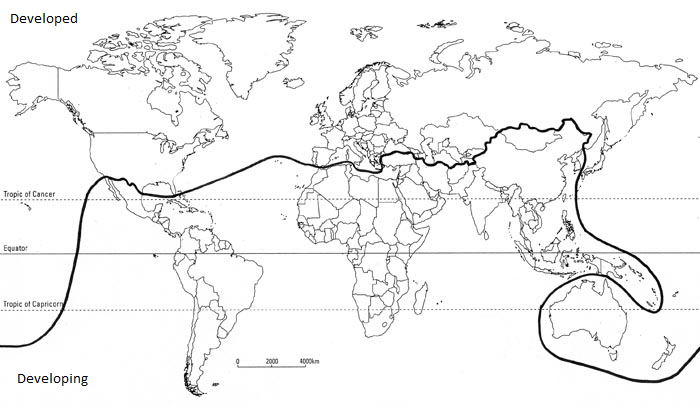
The Brandt line, dividing the world into the developed north and the developing south

The Brandt Line is a visual depiction of the North–South divide between their economies, based on GDP per capita, proposed by Willy Brandt in the 1980s. It encircles the world at a latitude of 30° N, passing between North and Central America, north of Africa, the Middle East and most of East Asia, but lowered towards the south to include Japan, Australia, and New Zealand above the line.

Roughly twenty years after the publication of the Brandt Commission's first report, it was updated by James Quilligan, who was Information Director for the Brandt Commission between 1980 and 1987. His updated report was called "The Brandt Equation."

== See also ==
- Group of 77
- Global North and Global South
