= Clifford Evans =

Clifford Evans may refer to:

- Clifford Evans (actor) (1912–1985), Welsh actor
- Cliff Evans (rugby league) (1913–1982), Welsh rugby league footballer
- Clifford Evans (ecologist) (1913–2006), British ecologist
- Clifford Percy Evans (1889–1973), American architect
- Clifford R. Evans (1937–2018), Canadian trade unionist
