= Shirley Carr =

Canadian trade unionist (1929–2010)

Shirley Carr OC OOnt

5th president of the Canadian Labour Congress
- In office 1986–1992
- Preceded by: Dennis McDermott
- Succeeded by: Bob White

4th secretary-treasurer of the Canadian Labour Congress
- In office 1984–1986
- President: Dennis McDermott
- Preceded by: Donald Montgomery
- Succeeded by: Richard Mercier

Personal details
- Born: May 1929 Niagara Falls, Ontario, Canada
- Died: June 24, 2010 (aged 81) Niagara Falls, Ontario, Canada

Shirley Geraldine Edwina Carr OC OOnt (May 1929 – June 24, 2010) was a Canadian union leader who was the first woman president of Canada's largest labour organization, the Canadian Labour Congress.

== Union activism ==
Carr first became active in the labour movement in 1960, when she was employed by the City of Niagara Falls and a member of CUPE Local 133, then in 1970, she became an employee of the Regional Municipality of Niagara and the founding President of CUPE Local 1287. She became general vice-president of the Canadian Union of Public Employees in 1969, and also served as president of CUPE's Ontario Division between 1972 and 1974. Between 1974 and 1984, she held the position of executive vice-president of the Canadian Labour Congress. In 1984, she became secretary-treasurer of the CLC, and in 1986 was elected its president.

== CLC presidency ==
As president of the CLC, she began Canadian labour's campaign against the Canada-US Free Trade Agreement, a deal promoted by then-prime minister Brian Mulroney and the late US president Ronald Reagan and signed in 1988.

== Chairperson of the Workers' Group in the International Labour Organisation ==
Carr was elected in 1991 to be the first female chairperson of the Workers' Group in the ILO, and as such vice president of the Governing Body of the ILO. She served in this position until 1993.

== Honours and positions ==
As the first female president of Canada's largest labour federation, Carr was awarded numerous honours. She was made an Officer of the Order of Canada in 1980 and a Member of the Order of Ontario in 1995. She received the Centennial Medal for Exemplary Contribution to Vocational/Technical Education in 1980, the Commemorative Medal for the 125th Anniversary of Canadian Federation in 1992, and the Governor General's Award in Commemoration of the Persons Case in 1994. She was also awarded honorary doctorates from Acadia University, Brock University, McMaster University, University of Northern British Columbia, University of Western Ontario, University of Victoria, and York University.

Trade union offices
Preceded by Joe Morris	Executive Vice President of the Canadian Labour Congress; 1974–1984	Succeeded by Dick Martin
Preceded by Dennis McDermott	President of the Canadian Labour Congress; 1986–1992	Succeeded by Bob White
