= Cliff Evans (artist) =

American artist

- Born: 1977 (age 48–49); Darkwood, Australia
- Education: School of the Museum of Fine Arts, Boston, University of Texas at Austin
- Known for: Photography, Video Art

Cliff Evans (born 1977) is an American multidisciplinary artist of Australian origin.

== Biography ==
Evans was born in New South Wales in Australia. He grew up in East Texas. He received his BFA from the School of the Museum of Fine Arts in Boston. Evans lives and works in Arbutus and Baltimore.

== Exhibitions ==
=== Solo ===
- 2006 "The Road to Mount Weather," curated by Pieranna Cavalchini, Location One, New York, NY
- 2007 "Cliff Evans: The Road to Mount Weather," curated by Chris Coleman, University of Oregon, Eugene, OR
- 2007 “Cliff Evans: Empyrean,” curated by Pieranna Cavalchini, Isabella Stewart Gardner Museum, Boston, MA
- 2008 “Empyrean,”curated by Stephan Stoyanob, Luxe Gallery, New York, NY.
- 2008 “Empyrean,” curated by Jason Hughes and Andrea Pollan, The Library, Baltimore, MD
- 2008 “The Road to Mount Weather,” curated by Cory Knedler, The University of South Dakota, Vermillion, SD
- 2008 “The Road to Mount Weather,” curated by Andrea Pollan, Curator’s Office
- 2009 “Empyrean,” curated by Jacqueline Ehlis, Stephan Stoyanov Gallery, New York, NY
- 2010 “Citizen,” curated by Stephan Stoyanov, Myhren Gallery, University of Denver, Denver, CO
- 2010 “Citizen,” curated by Christopher Coleman, Laleh Mehran, Dan Jacobs. The Stamp Gallery, University of Maryland, College Park, MD
- 2012 “Sites and Stations,” curated by Jason Hughes
- 2012 “Drones in the Garden,” curated by Andrea Pollan, Curator’s Office, Washington, DC

=== Group ===
- 2013 “Moving Image: London,” Andrea Pollan & Curator’s Office Bargehouse, London, UK

== Awards ==
- Best Experimental Film, Museum School Film & Video Annual, 2003
- Deans Discretionary Fund, Museum School, 2003
- Princess Grace Award Nomination, 2004
- 5th Year Traveling Scholar, Museum School, 2004
- Charles Amos Cummings Memorial Scholarship, Museum School, 2004
- Clarissa Bartlett Scholarship, Museum School, 2004
- Artforum's Top 10 Artist Films for 2006 as picked by MOMA curator Barbara London
- Younger Than Jesus: Artist Directory, New Museum, Phaidon, 2009
- Premio Giovani Collezionisti Prize - Finalist, ROMA, 2010
