= James Suffridge =

American labor unionist

7th International President of the Retail Clerks International Union
- In office 1953–1968
- Preceded by: Clarence C. Coulter
- Succeeded by: James Housewright

International Secretary-Treasurer of the Retail Clerks International Union
- In office 1947–1953

5th International President of the Retail Clerks International Union
- In office 1944–1947

Personal details
- Born: Knoxville, Tennessee, U.S.

James A. Suffridge (February 2, 1909 – June 7, 2001) was an American labor unionist.

Born in Knoxville, Tennessee, Suffridge's father encouraged him to box as a child. James then followed his father in becoming a grocer, moving to Oakland, California, where he joined the Retail Clerks International Union (RCIU). He was soon elected as leader of his local, in which role he encouraged Asian Americans to join the union, while they were often excluded from other unions. He also became known for making compromises with large grocery chains, in exchange for them permitting their workers to unionize.

In 1944, Suffridge was elected as president of the RCIU, moving to the top position of secretary-treasurer in 1947. He moved the union's headquarters to Lafayette, Indiana, and then to Washington D.C.. In 1953, the union decided to make the presidency its senior position, and Suffridge moved back into it. He came to national prominence, and in 1961 went on an international goodwill tour with Lyndon B. Johnson. He was elected as president of the International Federation of Commercial, Clerical, and Technical Employees in 1964.

Suffridge retired from the RCIU in 1968, and from the international federation two years later. He moved to Fort Myers, Florida, where he was active in the Shriners and played golf.

Trade union offices
Preceded by W. G. Desepte	President of the Retail Clerks International Union; 1944–1947	Succeeded by Vernon Housewright
Preceded by C. C. Coulter	General Secretary of the Retail Clerks International Union; 1947–1953	Succeeded by Vernon Housewright
Preceded by Vernon Housewright	President of the Retail Clerks International Union; 1953–1968	Succeeded by James Housewright
Preceded by William A. Lee; J. Scott Milne	American Federation of Labor delegate to the Trades Union Congress; 1954; With: Paul L. Phillips	Succeeded by Michael Fox; C. J. Haggerty
Preceded by Joe Hiscock	President of the International Federation of Commercial, Clerical, and Technical Employees; 1964–1970	Succeeded by Alfred Allen
