= William H. Wynn =

American labor leader (1932–2002)

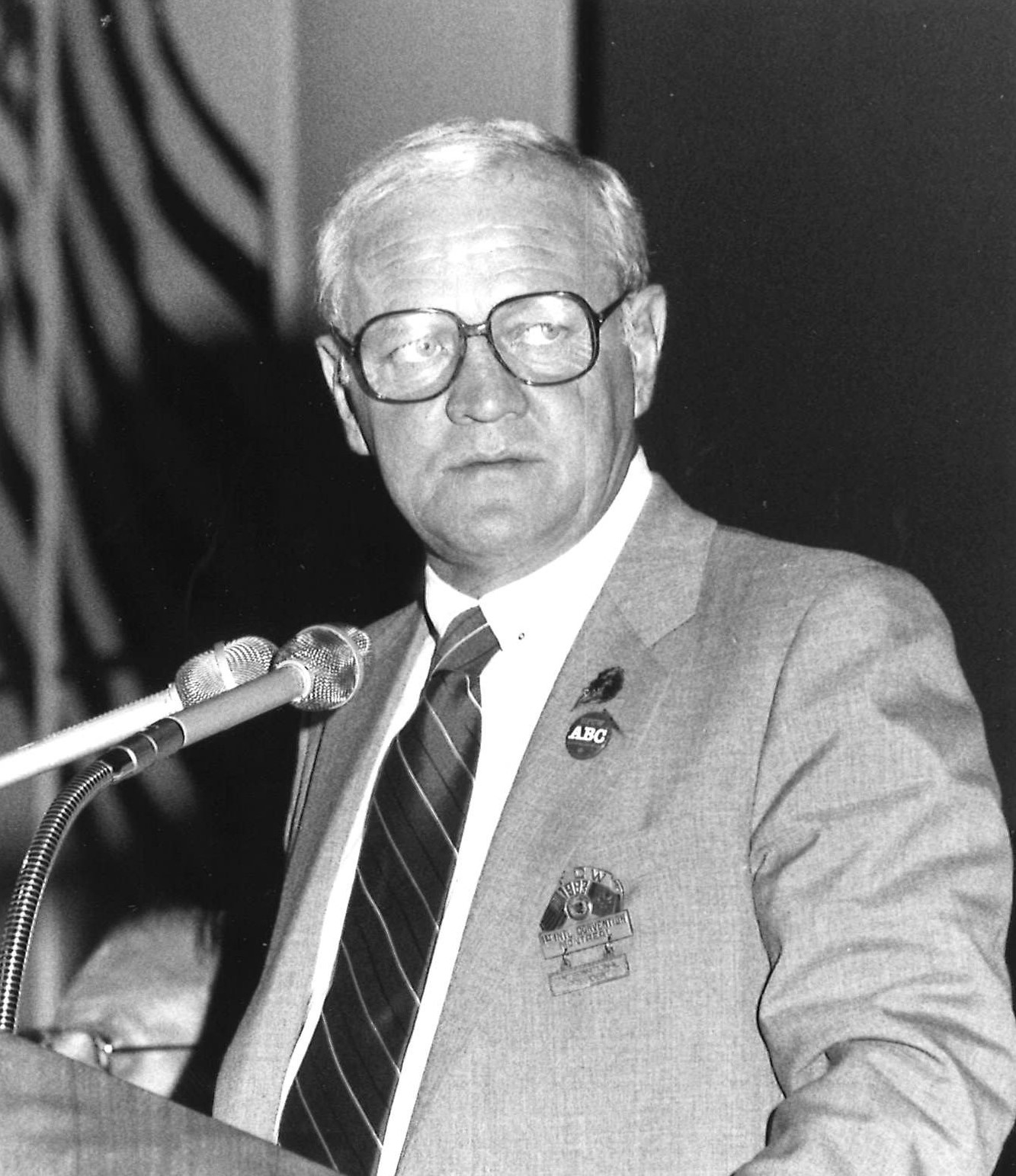

1st International President of the United Food and Commercial Workers
- In office 1979–1994
- Preceded by: Position established
- Succeeded by: Douglas H. Dority

8th International President of the Retail Clerks International Union
- In office 1977–1979
- Preceded by: James Housewright
- Succeeded by: Position dissolved

Personal details
- Born: 1932 South Bend, Indiana, U.S.
- Died: February 21, 2002 (aged 69–70) Naples, Florida, U.S.
- Party: Democratic Party (United States)
- Occupation: Grocery retail clerk, trade unionist

William H. "Bill" Wynn (1932 – February 21, 2002) was the first president of the United Food and Commercial Workers International Union (UFCW), and the last president of the Retail Clerks International Union (RCIU), after the latter merged with the Amalgamated Meat Cutters and Butcher Workmen of North America in 1979, to create the UFCW. He is best known for playing a leading role in completing the above merger, and, through that effort, making a pivotal contribution to the creation of the largest union affiliated to the AFL–CIO at the time. Wynn is also credited for instituting a fierce organizing culture at UFCW.

== Early life ==
Bill Wynn came from a union family, with both of his parents, plus his uncle and brother-in-law, active in the United Auto Workers.

Wynn became a union member himself in 1948 when, at the age of 15, he started working at the Great Atlantic & Pacific Tea Company, or A&P, superstore in his hometown of South Bend, Indiana.

== Retail Clerks activism and career ==
Wynn was elected the full-time union representative for RCIU Local 37 in 1954, and in 1961 he was hired by the international to serve as an organizer for the RCIU Indiana District Council, and later became assistant director of the Northwestern Division.

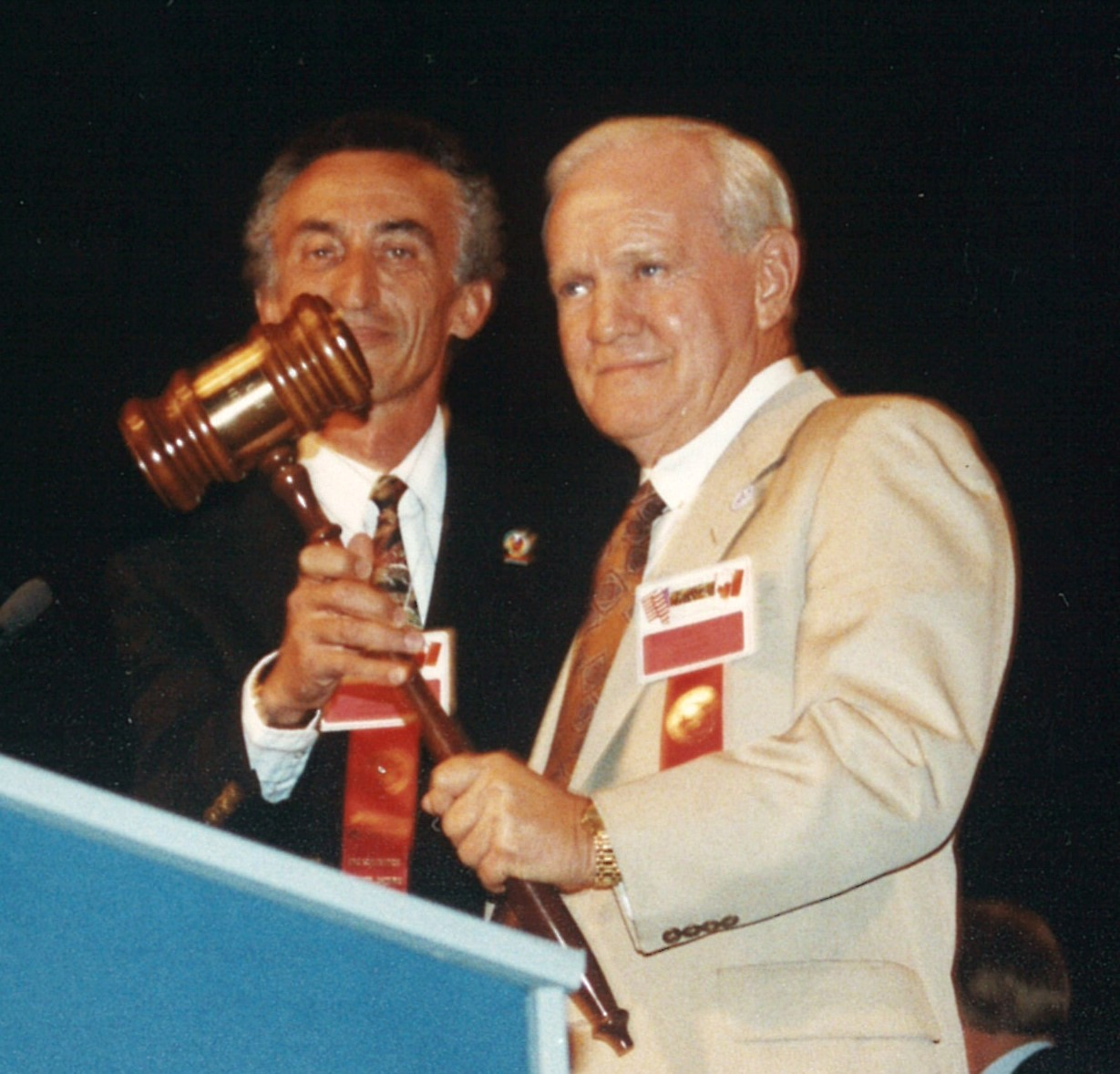
UFCW President William H. Wynn calling the union's 3rd Regular Convention to order. Pictured with UFCW Canadian Director Thomas Kukovica, 1993

Wynn was mentored by RCIU international representative James Housewright, who eventually became the international president, and who in 1969 called Wynn to the union's international headquarters in Washington to serve as assistant to the international director of organizing. Within the same year, Wynn was further promoted to administrative assistant to the international president, and two years later, he was made organizing director of the central division.

In 1971, Wynn was elected an international vice-president of the RCIU, and in 1976, he became the union's international secretary treasurer.

Following the untimely death of Housewright in 1977, Wynn was elected RCIU international president.

Wynn advanced the work started by Housewright regarding a merger effort with the Amalgamated Meat Cutters. Under Wynn's leadership, the merger was completed in 1979, and the UFCW was created, becoming the AFL–CIO's largest affiliated union.

== UFCW presidency ==
Wynn was the unanimous choice to lead the new union by delegates to the UFCW's founding convention in Montreal in 1979.

Through Wynn's leadership the UFCW grew significantly – via new member organizing and mergers with other unions – and pioneered the use of television advertising as a tactic and medium for comprehensive campaign approaches.

A vice-president of the AFL–CIO, Wynn chaired the labor federation's Organizing Committee, and served on the executive board of the A. Philip Randolph Institute.

== Political involvement ==
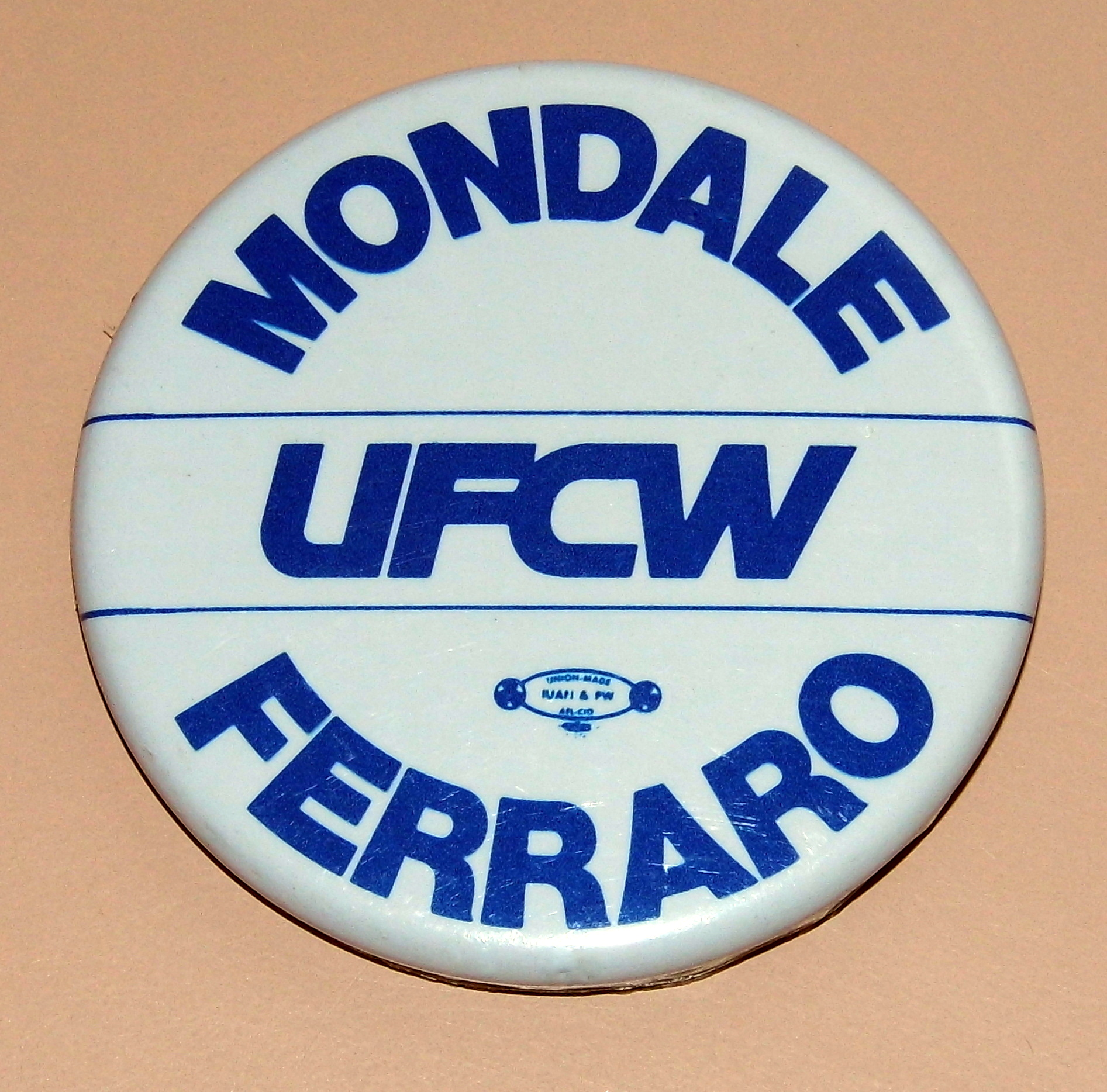

Wynn marshalled the UFCW behind Democratic candidates for president, and served on the committee to elect Jimmy Carter in 1979.

He also led the UFCW's effort on behalf of Walter Mondale and Geraldine Ferraro during the 1984 presidential campaign, becoming one of the first union leaders to encourage and support Ferraro's bid to be the first female vice-president of the United States.

== Death ==
Wynn died in Naples, Florida, in 2002 of a heart attack.
