= Final Offer =

- Directed by: Sturla Gunnarsson; Robert Collison
- Written by: Robert Collison
- Produced by: John Spotton; Sturla Gunnarsson; Robert Collison
- Narrated by: Henry Ramer
- Edited by: Jeff Warren
- Music by: Jack Lenz
- Distributed by: National Film Board of Canada
- Release date: 1985
- Running time: 79 minutes
- Country: Canada
- Language: English

Final Offer is a Canadian film documenting the 1984 contract negotiations between the United Auto Workers Union (UAW) and General Motors. Ultimately, it provided a historical record of the birth of the Canadian Auto Workers Union (CAW) as Bob White, the head of the Canadian sector of the UAW, led his membership out of the international union and created the CAW.

The movie depicts life in an era of massive industrial change in North America. The audience sees the emergence of automation and how it begins to affect the lives of the working class. Other themes depicted are labour relations, life on the picket line, and corporate restructuring.

A National Film Board of Canada production, Final Offer is directed by Sturla Gunnarsson and Robert Collison, written by Collison, and produced by Collison, Gunnarsson and John Spotton.

The movie features Henry Ramer as the narrator, Buzz Hargrove, Roger Smith, chairman of General Motors, and founding CAW president Bob White.

== Awards ==
- Banff Mountain Film Festival, Banff, Alberta: Grand Prize of the Festival, 1986
- Banff Mountain Film Festival, Banff, Alberta: Rockie Award for Best Political and Social Documentary, 1986
- 7th Genie Awards, Toronto: Best Feature Length Documentary, 1986
- Golden Gate International Film Festival, San Francisco: Special Jury Award, 1986
- Columbus International Film & Animation Festival, Columbus, Ohio: Chris Award, First Prize, Industry & Commerce, 1986
- Chicago International Film Festival, Chicago: Gold Plaque, Social/Political Documentary, 1986
- Prix Italia, International Competition for Radio and Television Productions, Lucca, Italy: Italia Award for Best Documentary, 1986

== See also ==
- Roger & Me – 1989 documentary film, featuring Roger Smith and Michael Moore
