= Retail Clerks International Union =

North American trade union

- Abbreviation: RCIU
- Merged into: United Food and Commercial Workers
- Formation: 1890
- Dissolved: 1979
- Type: Trade union
- Locations: Canada; United States
- Affiliations: AFL-CIO; Canadian Labour Congress
- Formerly called: Retail Clerks National Protective Union; Retail Clerks International Association (?–1977)

The Retail Clerks International Union (RCIU) was a North American labor union that represented retail employees.

== History ==
The RCIU was chartered as the Retail Clerks National Protective Union in 1890 by the American Federation of Labor. It later adopted the name Retail Clerks International Association, and subsequently became the Retail Clerks International Union. In 1979, the Retail Clerks merged with the Amalgamated Meat Cutters to form the United Food and Commercial Workers.

In 1934 the RCIU created a local chapter in Milwaukee, which quickly grew to over 600 members. Soon after the RCIU petitioned the Boston Store to raise employee wages for its men and women and to also officially recognize the union, a move that the store's management refused with the justification that only a few of the department store employees were union members. The union began striking on November 30, 1934, and the number of picketers soon swelled to over 1,500 picketers, which helped the strike gain national attention.

Over time the protest began to unravel as some picketers began to act out by assaulting strikebreakers and stink bombing the store, which led to arrests. In response the Boston Store ran full-page ads in local newspapers giving their side of their story, a move that was met with a similar full-page ad by the Federated Trades Commission in the Milwaukee Leader. However as the store's management was unwilling to meet the union's demands, the union lost their ground when most of the union workers returned to their jobs. On January 11, 1935, the strike officially ended with none of the demands met and the store's only concession being merit-based bonuses for the strikers.

In late 1957 and most of 1958, there was a 13-month-long strike against three department stores in Toledo, Ohio, Lasalle & Koch, Lamson's, and Lion Store, by the Retail Clerks International Association. The strike was settled by a "Statement of Understanding" under which the striking workers were reinstated to their jobs but the union was not recognized.

The Boot and Shoe Workers' Union merged with the Retail Clerks International Union in 1977.

== Leaders ==
The senior official was initially the general secretary, later the secretary-treasurer. From 1953, it was the president.

1891: W. S. Pittman
1893: Ed Mallory
1895: Max Morris
1909: H. J. Conway
1926: Clarence C. Coulter
1947: James Suffridge
1968: James Housewright
1977: William H. Wynn
