= CAW Locals =

Local bargaining units of the Canadian Auto Workers Union

This is a complete list of the local bargaining units of the Canadian Auto Workers (CAW) Union.

- Local 27
- Local 40
- Local 61
- Local 88
- Local 100
- Local 101
- Local 110 - now TCRC Division 105 Locomotive Engineers
- Local 111
- Local 112
- Local 114
- Local 127
- Local 144
- Local 195
- Local 199
- Local 200
- Local 219
- Local 222
- Local 229
- Local 240
- Local 252
- Local 275
- Local 302
- Local 333
- Local 350
- Local 385
- Local 397
- Local 414
- Local 432
- Local 444
- Local 462
- Local 483
- Local 510
- Local 512
- Local 523
- Local 567
- Local 584
- Local 598
- Local 599
- Local 636
- Local 673
- Local 676
- Local 707
- Local 830
- Local 991
- Local 1001
- Local 1090
- Local 1120
- Local 1256
- Local 1285
- Local 1451
- Local 1520
- Local 1524
- Local 1859
- Local 1941
- Local 1959
- Local 1967
- Local 1973
- Local 1995
- Local 1996
- Local 2000
- Local 2002
- Local 2003
- Local 2107
- Local 2169
- Local 2182
- Local 2200
- Local 2245
- Local 2301
- Local 2458
- Local 3000
- Local 3003
- Local 3005
- Local 3019
- Local 4000
- Local 4050
- Local 4207
- Local 4209
- Local 4212
- Local 4234
- Local 4268
- Local 4278
- Local 4300
- Local 4304
- Local 4600
- Local 4606
- Local 5454
- FFAW/CAW
- CAW/MWF Local 1
