= Jerry Dias =

Canadian trade unionist (born 1958)

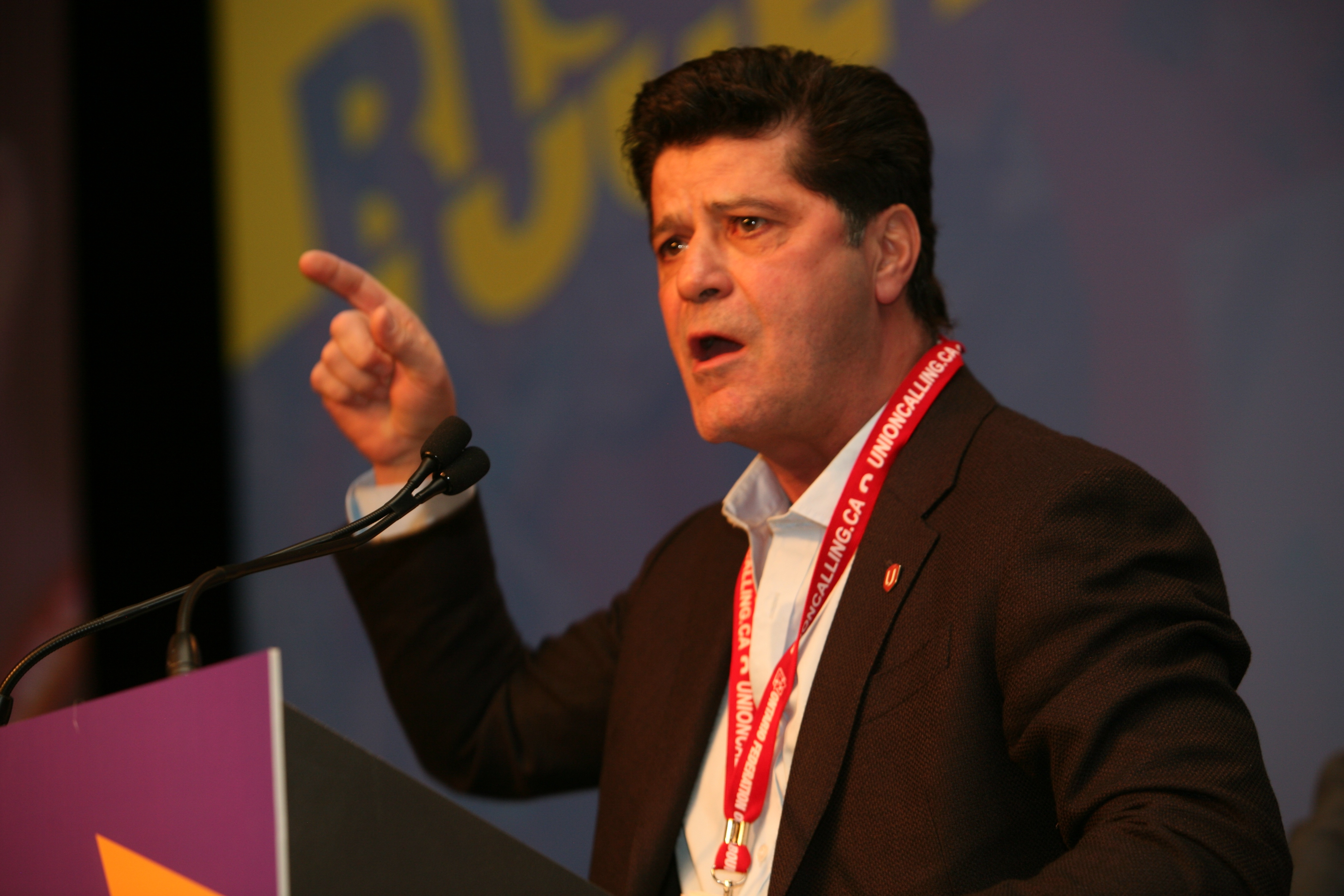
- Dias at the 2013 Ontario Federation of Labour convention

1st President of Unifor
- In office August 31, 2013 – March 13, 2022
- Preceded by: Position established
- Succeeded by: Lana Payne

President of Canadian Auto Workers, Local 112
- In office 1987–1993

Personal details
- Born: Jerome P. Dias Jr. October 10, 1958 (age 68) Toronto, Ontario, Canada
- Profession: Trade unionist

Jerome P. Dias Jr. (born October 10, 1958) is a Canadian trade unionist who was elected the first national president of Unifor in August 2013 at the union’s founding convention following the merger between the Canadian Auto Workers and the Communications, Energy and Paperworkers Union of Canada.

Since then Unifor has grown to represent more than 315,000 workers in every major sector of the Canadian economy. As National President of the largest private sector union in Canada, Dias advocates for workers’ rights, equality and social justice.

Dias was re-elected to his post in 2016 and 2019. On March 13, 2022, he announced his immediate retirement for health reasons. Shortly after, he was accused of taking a $50,000 bribe from COVID-19 test manufacturers in January. He was succeeded by Lana Payne on August 10, 2022.

== Early life and background ==
Dias was born in Toronto, Ontario, as one of four children of Juliet Mary (1931-2015) and Jerry Sr. who were both labour activists. He attended Neil McNeil High School, Sir Wilfrid Laurier and York University in Toronto before starting work at de Havilland Aircraft (now Bombardier Aerospace). Dias became active in the labour movement at de Havilland, eventually following his father’s example as president of Local 112. He went on to join the union’s national staff as aerospace sector coordinator and ultimately became a senior assistant to CAW presidents Buzz Hargrove and Ken Lewenza Sr. prior to his election as Unifor national president.

As a young adult, he also spent time on the line at the General Motors Canada Ltd. van assembly plant in Scarborough, Ontario. In 1984, he ended up on strike in the labour dispute that led to the Canadian division of the UAW splitting off and forming the CAW.

Dias has been twice named among the country’s 50 most powerful people by Maclean’s, in 2013 and most recently in 2020. He has been called the ‘5 billion blue-collar man’ in the Financial Post, one of the most fearsome people in the country by Sun News, and Canada’s most influential union leader by Ottawa Life. He was also named the Toronto Star Wheels’ Newsmaker of the Year in 2016 and 2020, one of CTV’s Don Martin's political power players of 2018, and is a multiple Automotive News All Star.

Dias is of Portuguese-Guyanese ancestry.

== Union activism ==
Dias has been vocal on emerging labour issues including precarious work, youth unemployment and underemployment, growing income inequality and lack of work-life balance.

Dias has negotiated with corporate employers to improve working conditions for union members and has worked to increase living standards.

Dias assumed an active role in the USMCA as a consultant to the Canadian government and negotiating team where he consistently pushed to raise labour standards domestically and internationally, maintain Canadian sovereignty and protect key domestic industries.

In 2018, Dias launched the ‘Save Oshawa GM’ campaign after General Motors (GM) announced plans to end vehicle production in Oshawa after a century of operations. The campaign included mass protests, television commercials that aired on the Super Bowl and the Grammys and a live concert by international recording artist Sting and the cast of his musical The Last Ship performed in solidarity with Unifor members.

In May 2019, Unifor held a joint news conference with GM to announce the footprint would be maintained in Oshawa, saving hundreds of jobs. The plant transitioned to parts manufacturing operations, producing service parts such as doors, hoods, fenders, tailgates, and deck lids, and during the COVID-19 outbreak medical masks for Health Canada.

In 2020, during negotiations with the Detroit Three automakers, Ford, Fiat Chrysler Automobiles and General Motors, Dias secured nearly $6 billion in total investments for auto facilities across Canada, including $3.3 billion to introduce battery electric and plug-in hybrid electric vehicle production at the FCA Windsor Assembly Plant and Ford Oakville Assembly Complex. The investments included contributions from both the federal Liberal and Ontario Progressive Conservative governments. Dias also succeeded in returning vehicle assembly to Oshawa, Ontario with GM investing an estimated $1.3 billion to retool the plant to build Silverado and Sierra models. The investment solidifies the Oshawa complex as GM’s only North American plant to actively build both light and heavy duty pickup trucks.

Dias was arrested and jailed in January 2020 at a picket line at the Co-op Refinery in Regina, Saskatchewan. The first Canadian labour leader jailed since Jean-Claude Parrot in 1979.

Following a bitter six-month long labour dispute with Co-op, predominately over pensions, Unifor was successful in maintaining the defined benefit plans for its members.

During the COVID-19 pandemic, Dias led the campaign for stronger wage subsidies for unemployed workers, increased regulation and improved staffing and working conditions in long-term care facilities, and higher pay for essential frontline workers in health care and retail.

On February 6, 2022, Dias went on medical leave, and on March 11 he informed Unifor's executive board of an early retirement. On March 15, it was reported that Dias has been under investigation since January for "an alleged breach of the union's constitution."

In 2022, he was accused of accepting $50,000 from a pharmaceutical company in exchange for endorsing the company's COVID testing products to the union members' employers. Dias issued a public statement saying that he had entered a rehab programme, having abused alcohol and painkillers to deal with a problem relating to sciatic nerve pain, which he claimed had impaired his judgment. On April 4, the Toronto Police Service stated that its financial crimes unit had opened an investigation into the matter. The allegations also caused TVOntario to pull a scheduled episode of its television documentary series Political Blind Date, featuring Dias and Monte McNaughton discussing trade unionism, which had already been produced and scheduled but had not yet aired when the allegations were publicized. In May 2023, the Toronto Police and Unifor issued statements that Dias respectively would not be charged and would not be subject to further union proceedings.

== Political action ==
Under Dias Unifor has been politically active in provincial and federal elections. The union is not affiliated with a specific political party and often encourages strategic voting determined on worker and social issues.

In February 2014, Dias challenged Ontario Progressive Conservative leader Tim Hudak to a debate and campaigned against Hudak policies in the June 2014 election in which Hudak was defeated and ultimately resigned.

Provincially Unifor supported NDP leader Rachel Notley in the 2015 and 2019 Alberta elections and also campaigned for NDP leader John Horgan in the 2017 and 2020 British Columbia elections.

As a leader in third party advertising during the 2015 federal election campaign, Dias publicly jousted with Stephen Harper’s government with Unifor playing a major role in the defeat of high-profile Conservative candidates.

Dias also battled Conservative leader Andrew Scheer in the run up to the 2019 federal election, calling for a strategic vote against Conservative candidates across the country.

== Social activism ==
Dias and his union publicly advocate for Indigenous Reconciliation, racial equality, LGBT rights, gender equality and the elimination of violence against women. Under his leadership, Unifor’s groundbreaking Woman’s Advocate Program has expanded into workplaces across Canada. The union launched its Racial Advocate Program in 2020.

A Board Director at the Halton Women's Place, Dias leads a team each year at the shelter’s ‘Hope in High Heels’ walk to raise money and increase awareness of violence against women. As of 2020, Dias has raised more than $650,000 in support of the shelters run by Halton Women’s Place.
