= Unifor National Council 4000 =

- Founded: November 1997
- Headquarters: Area Offices Winnipeg, Manitoba - Office of the President, Brampton, Ontario, Brossard, Quebec; Grande Prairie, Alberta; Moncton, New Brunswick
- Location: Canada
- Members: 5060
- Key people: Dave Kissack, President (Based in Winnipeg, Manitoba); Laura Hazlitt, Secretary-Treasurer (Based in Winnipeg, Manitoba)
- Parent organization: Unifor
- Website: www.unifor4000.com

Unifor National Council 4000 is the umbrella organization for five regionally based Unifor Local Unions across Canada that represent more than 5,060 members in various sectors, largely within the railway and transportation industry. It is the largest rail Local within Unifor.

Prior to the launch of Unifor during the 2013 Labour Day weekend in Toronto with the merger of the Canadian Auto Workers and Communications, Energy and Paperworkers unions, National Council 4000 was affiliated with the CAW and known as CAW National Council 4000.

Unifor is now the largest private sector Union in Canada, with more than 315,000 workers and associate members in industries ranging from railway and transportation to manufacturing and media to forestry and fishing, and many other private and public sector areas.

CAW National Council Logo 1997-2013

CAW Council 4000 was formed in November 1997 at the Founding Convention held at the CAW Family Education Centre (now Unifor Family Education Centre) located on the shores of Lake Huron in Port Elgin, Ontario. The delegates to this convention voted to change the bargaining unit structure of the former Canadian Brotherhood of Railway, Transport and General Workers Union (CBRT&GW), which merged with the National Automobile, Aerospace, Transportation and General Workers Union of Canada (CAW-Canada) in 1994, from 45-local unions situated across Canada, choosing to form a national council with five regionally based locals to service members from coast-to-coast.

The CBRT&GW, which was initially called the Canadian Brotherhood of Railway Employees (CBRE), was Canada's first sole Canadian Union founded in Moncton, New Brunswick on October 12, 1908. This was before the creation of Canadian National Railways (CNR), then a Federal Crown corporation, which saw the amalgamation of government owned railways and the several others that had become bankrupt and placed into government hands.

Unifor National Council 4000 represents workers employed at CN and Via Rail Canada, which makes up the majority of the Council 4000 membership across Canada. Additionally, Council 4000 represents workers at Atlantic Wholesalers (DC24) (Loblaw Companies) and Loblaw Companies / Atlantic Wholesalers (DC06); Bay Ferries; CHEP Canada; CN (formerly Savage Alberta Railway); Cummins; DHL Express; Discovery Centre; Loomis Express (Transforce); Nova Scotia Federation of Labour support staff; Rocky Mountain Catering Co. Ltd.; Securitas at the Twin Rivers Paper Company in Edmundston, N.B.; Toronto Terminals Railway; Wajax Equipment, and the World Trade and Convention Centre Halifax.

== National Council 4000 Leadership ==
[D] - Denotes deceased

== Presidents of National Council 4000 ==
Unifor

- Dave Kissack (December 22, 2017 to present)
- Steven Harding (Interim June 1, 2017 to December 21, 2017)
- Barry Kennedy (September 1, 2013 to May 31, 2017) Vacated office on appointment as Unifor National Representative

CAW

- Barry Kennedy (September 28, 2009 – August 31, 2013)
- Ron Shore (Interim CAW August 1-September 27, 2009)
- Bob Fitzgerald (CAW January 2005–July 31, 2009) Vacated office on appointment as CAW National Representative
- Rick Johnston (CAW November 2, 1997–January 2005)

== Secretary-Treasurers of National Council 4000 ==
Unifor

- Laura Hazlitt (March 18, 2023 to present)
- Danny Andru (July 1, 2015 to March 17, 2023)
- Heather Grant (September 1, 2013 – June 30, 2015)

CAW

- Heather Grant (2008–2013)
- Bill Coolen (CAW 1997–2008)

== Regional Representatives of National Council 4000 ==
System CNTL - Locals 4001, 4002, 4003, 4004 and 4005

Unifor

- Amir Zaidi (July 1, 2024 to present)
- Prabhjot Sekhon (November 8, 2021 to June 30, 2024)
- Wesley Gajda (September 1, 2013 to November 7, 2021)

CAW

- Wesley Gajda (2012–2013)

Local 4001 (Mountain Region)

Unifor

- Ryan Mills (February 1, 2024 to present)
- David Judge (November 8, 2021 to January 31, 2024)
- Ron Shore (September 1, 2013 to November 7, 2021)

CAW

- Ron Shore (2009–2013)
- Dave Kissack (2009–2012)
- Barry Kennedy (2000–2009)
- Dave Mercer-Hazlitt (2000–2009)
- Tom Donohue (1997–2000)
- Stan Pogorzclec (1997–2000)

Local 4002 (Prairie Region)

Unifor

- Jennifer Long (January 1, 2024 to present)
- Laura Hazlitt (December 22, 2017 to December 31, 2023)
- Dave Kissack (September 1, 2013 to December 21, 2017)

CAW

- Dave Kissack (2009–2013)
- Dan Michaluk (2009–2012)
- Rick Doherty (1997–2009)
- Dave Mercer-Hazlitt (2000–2009)
- Stan Pogorzclec (1997–2000)

Local 4003 (Great Lakes Region)

Unifor

- Gordon Cox (July 16, 2024 to present)
- Kristi Boisvert (November 8, 2021 to present)
- Kendall Montrose (July 1, 2018 to November 7, 2021)
- Mark Robinson (July 1, 2015 to June 30, 2018)
- Andrew Stephen (July 1, 2015 to present)
- Danny Andru (September 1, 2013 – June 30, 2015)
- Jared White (September 1, 2013 – June 30, 2015)

CAW

- Jared White (2012–2013)
- Danny Andru (1997–2003 / 2006–2013)
- John Almdal (2008–2012)
- Sandra Prudames (2005–2007)
- Bob Fitzgerald (2000–2005)
- Tony Blanchard (2003–2006) [D]
- Maurus Allum (1997–2000)
- Robin Bir (1997–2000)

Local 4004 (St. Lawrence Region)

Unifor

- Mario Laroche (July 16, 2024 to present)
- Gordon Cox (July 16, 2024 to present)
- Mario Laroche (July 1, 2015 to July 15, 2024)
- Andrew Stephen (July 1, 2015 to present)
- Serge Auger (September 1, 2013 – June 30, 2015)
- Danny Andru (September 1, 2013 – June 30, 2015)

CAW

- Serge Auger (2006–2013)
- Danny Andru (2012–2013)
- Jean Savard (2009–2012)
- Claude Rainville (1998–2009)
- Benoit Dulong (2005–2006)
- Heather Grant (2003–2006)
- Robert Masse (1998–2005)
- Pierre Rouleau (1997–2003)
- Danny Andru (1997–1998)
- Rick Johnston (1997–1998)

Local 4005 (Atlantic Region)

Unifor

- Rheanne Gautreau (July 18, 2024 to present)
- Mike Maillet (July 16–17, 2024)
- Rheanne Gautreau (March 10, 2022 to July 15, 2024)
- Jennifer Murray (July 1, 2015 to March 9, 2022)
- Jennifer Murray (Interim February 1, 2015 – June 30, 2015)
- Patrick Murray (September 1, 2013 – January 31, 2015)

CAW

- Patrick Murray (2012–2013)
- Lou Walsh (2008–2012)
- Jean Savard (2009–present)
- Claude Rainville (2003–2009)
- Heather Grant (2003–2008)
- Robert Masse (1998–2005)
- Dana Hollis (1998–2003)
- Pierre Rouleau (1998–2003)

== Regional Local Presidents ==
Unifor Local 4001

- Ricky Brar (July 9, 2022 – present)
- Tajender Singh Shergill (TJ) (July 1, 2019 - July 8, 2022)
- David Judge (July 16, 2016 – June 30, 2019)
- John Dowell (September 1, 2013 – July 15, 2016)

CAW Local 4001

- John Dowell (2009–2013)
- Ron Shore (2007–2009)
- Clyde Duncan (2004–2007)
- Mel Wozniak (2001–2004)
- Stan Tash (1997–2001) [D]

Unifor Local 4002

- Robyn Shaver (Interim February 14, 2024 – present)
- Dan Forbes (Interim September 16, 2023 – February 13, 2024)
- Kristopher Whittaker (November 1, 2020 – September 15, 2023)
- Brian Donaldson (September 1, 2013 – October 31, 2020)

CAW Local 4002

- Brian Donaldson (2013)
- Joey Broda (2012–2013)
- Brad Roy (2008–2012)
- Jeff Snell (2007–2008)
- Dan Michaluk (2005–2007)
- Kerry Kauk (2004–2005[D]) [D]
- Dan Michaluk (1997–2004)

Unifor Local 4003

- Sina Piluso (August 1, 2020 – present)
- Zbigniew (Zibby) Slowiak (August 30, 2019 – July 31, 2020)
- Frank Consiglio (September 1, 2013 – August 29, 2019)

CAW Local 4003

- Frank Consiglio (2010–2013)
- Steve Legge (2007–2010)
- Brian Elcombe (2004–2007)
- Gil Stephens (1997–2004)

Unifor Local 4004

- Gordon Cox (December 2021 – present)
- Martine Guay (August 23, 2019 - November 2021)
- Kesang Kashi (February 4, 2014 – August 22, 2019)
- Jean Simard (September 1, 2013 – February 3, 2014)

CAW Local 4004

- Jean Simard (2013)
- Monica Hrapkowicz (2006–2013)
- Daniel Ouellet (2004–2006)
- Ken Cameron (2000–2004)
- Jean Savard (Interim 2000)
- Daniel Boiteau (1997–2000)

Unifor Local 4005

- Steven Harding (July 2025 to Present)
- Luke Woodworth (October 2022 to June 2025)
- Rheanne Gautreau (January 24, 2022 - March 10, 2022)
- Zach Wells (February 15, 2021 – March 4, 2021)
- Steven Harding (September 4, 2015 – February 14, 2021)
- Luke Woodworth (Interim June 1, 2017 – December 21, 2017)
- George Baker (September 1, 2013 – September 3, 2015[D]) [D]

CAW Local 4005

- George Baker (2013) [D]
- Jennifer Brown (2010–2013)
- Warren Hutt (2001–2010)
- Bob Dennis (2000–2001) [D]
- Fred Warren (1997–2000)

== Council 4000 Administrative Assistants ==
- Sylvie Bruneau (1998–April 2017)
- Nicole Pitchen (1997–1998)

== Unifor National Council 4000 Conventions ==
Year • Location • Venue:

- 2022 • Port Elgin, Ontario (25th Anniversary Convention) • Unifor Family Education Centre
- 2020 • Surrey, British Columbia • Civic Hotel
- 2016 • Winnipeg, Manitoba • Fort Garry Hotel
- 2013 • Edmonton, Alberta • Westin Edmonton

== CAW National Council 4000 Conventions ==
Year • Location • Venue:

- 2010 • Halifax, Nova Scotia • Delta Halifax
- 2007 • Montreal, Quebec • Delta Montreal
- 2003 • Toronto, Ontario • Sheraton Centre Toronto Hotel
- 2000 • Montreal, Quebec • Queen Elizabeth Hotel
- 1997 • Port Elgin, Ontario (Founding Convention) • CAW Family Education Centre

== Unifor Council 4000 employers, occupations and locations ==
- CN - Administrative, Accounting Representatives, Bunkhouse Attendants, Chauffeurs, CN Intermodal employees, Crew Dispatchers, Customer Service Representatives, Equipment Operators, Excavator Operators (Mountain Region Local 4001), Heavy Duty Mechanics, Heavy Equipment Operators, Intermodal operations, Labourers, Locomotive Hostlers, Fleet Mechanics, Payroll Representatives, Stores Representatives, Transportation Reporting Services - British Columbia, Alberta, Saskatchewan, Manitoba, Ontario, Quebec, New Brunswick, Nova Scotia - Local 4001, Local 4002, Local 4003, Local 4004, Local 4005
- CN Savage Alberta Railway - Conductors and Locomotive Engineers - Grande Cache and Grande Prairie, Alberta - Local 4001
- CN Transportation Ltd. (CNTL) - Owner Operator truck drivers - Kamloops, Prince George, Vancouver and Vancouver Island, British Columbia; Calgary and Edmonton, Alberta; Regina and Saskatoon, Saskatchewan; Winnipeg, Manitoba; Brampton, Ontario; Montreal, Quebec; Moncton, New Brunswick; Prince Edward Island; Halifax, Nova Scotia, and Newfoundland and Labrador - Local 4001, Local 4002, Local 4003, Local 4004, Local 4005
- Via Rail Canada - Administrative, Accounting Representatives, Baggage staff, Chefs, Customer Service Representatives, Equipment Operators, Labourers, Locomotive Attendants, On-Board Train personnel, Payroll Representatives, Stores Representatives, Ticket and Reservations personnel - British Columbia, Alberta, Saskatchewan, Manitoba, Ontario, Quebec, New Brunswick, Nova Scotia - Local 4001, Local 4002, Local 4003, Local 4004, Local 4005
- Rocky Mountain Catering Co. Ltd. - Culinary and Kitchen personnel and On-Board Train Chefs on the Rocky Mountaineer - Kamloops and Vancouver, British Columbia - Local 4001
- Toronto Terminals Railway - Union Station (Toronto) Track Services personnel - Toronto, Ontario - Local 4003
- Atlantic Wholesalers (Loblaw Companies) DC24- Fresh Warehouse staff - Moncton, New Brunswick - Local 4005
- Atlantic Wholesalers (Loblaw Companies) DC06- Freezer Warehouse staff - Moncton, New Brunswick, Local 4005
- Atlantic Wholesalers (Loblaw Companies) DC14- Dry goods Warehouse staff & Loblaw Company Drivers - Moncton, New Brunswick, Local 4005
- Bay Ferries - Customer Service - Yarmouth, Nova Scotia, Local 4005
- CHEP Canada - Manufacturing - Moncton, New Brunswick - Local 4005
- Cummins - Mechanics - Dartmouth, Nova Scotia, Local 4005
- DHL Express - Dartmouth, Nova Scotia, Local 4005
- Discovery Centre - Halifax, Nova Scotia - Local 4005
- Loomis Express (TransForce) - Couriers, Owner Operators and Warehouse staff - Dartmouth, Nova Scotia - Local 4005
- Nova Scotia Federation of Labour - Support staff - Halifax, Nova Scotia - Local 4005
- Securitas AB - Security personnel at Twin Rivers Paper Company (Fraser Papers Inc.) - Edmundston, New Brunswick - Local 4005
- Wajax Equipment - Dartmouth, Nova Scotia - Local 4005
- World Trade and Convention Centre - Chefs, Food and Beverage Servers, Commis Chefs and Kitchen Stewards - Halifax, Nova Scotia - Local 4005
