= Canadian Auto Workers =

Canadian labour union

- National Automobile, Aerospace, Transportation and General Workers Union of Canada
- Travailleurs canadiens de l'automobile
- Abbreviation: CAW
- Predecessor: United Auto Workers
- Merged into: Unifor
- Formation: 1985
- Dissolved: 2013
- Type: Trade union
- Headquarters: Toronto, Ontario, Canada
- Location: Canada
- Members: 190,000
- Presidents: Bob White; Buzz Hargrove; Ken Lewenza
- Affiliations: Canadian Labour Congress; International Metalworkers' Federation; International Transport Workers' Federation

The National Automobile, Aerospace, Transportation and General Workers Union of Canada, commonly known as the Canadian Auto Workers (CAW), was a major Canadian labour union that operated from 1985 until 2013. Established following a formal separation from the American-based United Auto Workers (UAW), the CAW represented workers in the automotive sector and later expanded into aerospace, transportation, and healthcare. On August 31, 2013, the organization concluded its independent existence by merging with the Communications, Energy and Paperworkers Union of Canada (CEP) to form Unifor, which became the largest private-sector union in Canada. The CAW was led by three successive presidents during its 28-year history: Bob White (1985–1992), Buzz Hargrove (1992–2008), and Ken Lewenza 2008–2013).

== History ==
=== Split from UAW ===
The CAW began as the Canadian Region of the United Auto Workers (UAW).

The UAW was founded in August 1935, and the Canadian Region of the UAW was established in 1937 following the 1937 GM Oshawa strike at General Motors's Oshawa, Ontario plant. The Canadian Region of the UAW unionized the Ford Motor Company in 1945 after a major strike which established the right of Canadian labour union members to union dues checkoff. George Burt was the Canadian Director of the United Auto Workers (UAW) from 1939 to 1968. He is the longest-serving leader of the Canadian Union at 29 years. He pioneered many contractual issues that affected Canadian auto workers in the early years of the union movement.

The reasons for the CAW split from the UAW are complicated. Holmes and Rusonik (1990) contend that although the Canadian labour movement has been seen as traditionally more militant than its American counterpart, it was in fact the uneven geographical development of both management and labour led the Canadian auto-workers to develop a distinctly different set of collective bargaining objectives, which placed them in a far stronger bargaining position as compared to the UAW in the US, and, ultimately, brought about the events that led directly to the Split. Two of the main forces demanding the restructuring of management and Labour during this time were the rise of Japan as a major automotive force, and the general recession of the world economy in the late 1970s and early 1980s. Aided by the Auto Pact and the weakening Canadian dollar in relation to the United States dollar, a geographic difference developed which provided some relief to many Canadian auto-workers.

By December 1984, significant differences in the value of negotiated contracts, and divergent union objectives had set the stage for the creation of the CAW, a process documented in the Genie Award winning film, Final Offer. In 1984, the Canadian section of the UAW, under the leadership of Bob White and his assistants Buzz Hargrove and Bob Nickerson, broke from the UAW, led by Owen Bieber, because the American union was seen as giving away too much in the way of concessions during collective bargaining. Additionally, the UAW had been lobbying the US Congress to force the transfer of auto production from Canada to the US and the Canadian branch felt there was a lack of a representative voice during UAW's conventions. By 1985 the split from the American union was complete and Bob White was acclaimed as the first President of the CAW. He served three terms as president..

=== Politics ===
After separation, the CAW began to grow quickly in size and stature. It merged with a number of smaller unions to double in size and become the largest private sector union in the country. Most notable were the mergers with the Fishermen, Food, and Allied Workers, the Independent Canadian Transit Union, and the Canadian Brotherhood of Railway Transport and General Workers (see CAW National Council 4000. The CAW also voiced strong opposition to the then-federal government of Prime Minister Brian Mulroney and such policies as the Goods and Services Tax and free trade.

In the case Fullowka et al. v. Royal Oak Ventures Inc, held in the aftermath of an 18-month strike at Royal Oak Mines in Yellowknife, the CAW was originally held responsible for 22% of damages at trial, before CAW was successful on appeal. The trial judge found that the union breached its duty of care by doing nothing to stop illegal acts during the strike, paying fines and legal fees for striking miners, providing a person to assist the miners' union who prolonged the strike, and failing to bargain in good faith. At trial, the court ruled that the cumulative effect of these breaches of the duty of care were found to have materially contributed to Roger Warren's bombing of the mine, which killed nine strikebreaking workers. Warren, a union member who had been fired from Royal Oak, testified that he was only capable of the bombing because strike-breakers had been "dehumanized" by the union and was sentenced to life in prison. However, these findings of liability were overturned on appeal by the Northwest Territories Court of Appeal and a decision by the Supreme Court of Canada was dismissed. Furthermore, CAW members Al Shearing and Tim Bettger were sentenced to two and a half and three years in prison, respectively. Both were convicted of painting anti-scab graffiti and setting an explosion in a ventilation shaft on June 29, 1992. Bettger was sentenced to an additional six months in prison for blowing a hole in a television satellite dish September 1 of that year. (The unioned miners were part of the Canadian Association of Smelter and Allied Workers union (CASAW) Local 4 at the time of the strike, and merged into the CAW in May 1994.)

In 1998, the CAW was deeply involved in discussions with Volvo Canada Ltd. and the Government of Nova Scotia over the closure of the Volvo Halifax Assembly plant. In 2000, the CAW was expelled from the Canadian Labour Congress when several union locals left the SEIU and joined the CAW, prompting accusations of union raiding. A settlement was reached a year later that allowed the CAW to rejoin the national labour federation but relations with other unions such as the International Brotherhood of Teamsters, the United Steel Workers of America and SEIU remain strained and the CAW remains outside of the Ontario Federation of Labour.

The CAW's relationship with other unions has also been strained due to its different political direction. The CAW is strongly left leaning and it has traditionally been a strong supporter of the New Democratic Party (NDP) and the Bloc Québécois. However, under former leader Buzz Hargrove, it began lending its support to the Liberal Party in ridings which the NDP were unlikely to win in the recent federal elections.

The CAW has attempted several times, all unsuccessful, to organize Toyota Motor Manufacturing Canada. TMMC Assistant General Manager and spokesman Greig Mordue stated "Our team members will decide whether or not a union best reflects their interest... At this point in time, we don't think they have anything to gain from a union", and described the defeat of the union drive saying "Our team members have recognized that a third party represents a complication they don't need." Despite this, however, the CAW supported Mordue as the Liberal candidate in the 2006 federal election instead of endorsing the NDP's Zoe Kunschner. Mordue attempted to take credit for bringing the new plant to Woodstock, but lost to Conservative incumbent Dave MacKenzie.

The 2006 federal election saw the governing Liberals lose power, despite CAW support. Afterwards, the Ontario NDP voted to expel Hargrove for supporting the Liberals, which automatically suspended his membership in the federal party. The CAW retaliated by severing all union ties with the NDP, a move formalized at the CAW's 2006 convention.

=== 2008–2010 automotive crisis ===
Industry analyst Anthony Faria has criticized the labour contracts that Canadian Auto Workers then-president Buzz Hargrove negotiated with the Big Three US automobile manufacturers in 2007, predicting that the subprime mortgage crisis and currency would hit Canadian auto production especially hard. Faria noted that UAW president Ron Gettelfinger agreed to have the UAW's "all-in" wage, benefit and pension costs drop from a high of $75.86 per hour in 2007 to an average of about $51 per hour starting in 2010. By comparison, the CAW's cost per hour was $77 in 2007 and will rise to over $80 per hour by the end of the new contract. Faria said that Gettelfinger went into negotiations "with the right intention...Save jobs. The CAW strategy was to squeeze every dime out of them." Hargrove was said to have "instilled backbone and an attitude that the union could always make the auto makers buckle at the bargaining table".

Current union president Ken Lewenza has argued that labour is not responsible for the bankruptcy crisis facing the Big Three automakers, saying that his members would not make concessions part of any taxpayer-funded bailout. Lawenza argued that the CAW agreed in 2007 to make concessions that will save the Big Three $900 million over three years.

A spokesman for the Canadian Taxpayers Federation has criticized the CAW's "no-concession" stance, saying that it only serves to strengthen the opposition to a taxpayer-funded bailout for the struggling Detroit Three automakers. The CTF further pointed out that "It is especially difficult to understand anyone asking for government help that refuses to do anything to help itself to begin with", since they "fail to realize they've existed at the substantial largesse of taxpayers for decades". Kelly McParland, a columnist for the National Post, has suggested that "if he won't give anything, he and his members are likely to lose everything." He also said that the problem facing the North American auto industry was borne equally by management and labour alike, criticizing labour for building up pay and benefits for themselves that was as unsustainable as it was enviable, while attacking management for its short-term strategy of selling gas-guzzling trucks and sales tactics (price cuts, rebates, free gas and cash-back schemes).

The CTF has opposed the proposed CAD $3.5 billion bailout for Canadian subsidiaries of the Big Three, saying that it was an unfair financial burden on the average Canadian, as well as another excuse for the Detroit automakers to postpone much needed change. The CTF noted that federal and provincial governments spent $782-million in the past five years on the Big Three, saying "These have been a bottomless pit of requests for cash". Lewenza disagreed, saying that the bailout should be seen by Canadians as a loan that will be paid back when the country's economy is prosperous again.

On December 20, the governments of Canada and Ontario offered $3.3 billion in loans to the auto industry. Under the plan GM was to receive $3 billion and Chrysler was to receive the rest. Ford only asked for a line of credit but did not be participating in the bailout.

The CAW negotiated a cost-cutting deal with General Motors Canada on March 8, 2009. The deal would extend the current contract for an additional year to September 2012, and preserves the current average assembly-worker base pay of about $34 an hour. It would eliminate a $1,700 annual "special bonus," and reduce special paid absences or "SPA days" from two weeks to one week a year, while maintaining vacation entitlements which range up to six weeks a year for high-seniority workers. The deal also introduced payments by members toward their health benefits - $30 monthly per family for workers and $15 a month for pensioners. Lewenza said it also would trim by 35 per cent company contributions to union-provided programs such as child care and wellness programs. Lewenza called the package a "major sacrifice." However, observers noted that the deal did not go far enough; Dominion Bond Rating Service analyst Kam Hon described it as "not material." Automotive industry consultant Dennis DesRosiers said that General Motors had missed the chance to slash labour costs, pointing out that bankruptcy was a looming threat, Ottawa and Queen's Park demanded cuts to the labour bill as a condition of the bailout, and that the deficit to the pension fund would prevent the CAW from striking. He estimated the total hourly cost of a GM Canada worker, including benefits, is $75 to $78, and saying that "they [GM] got six or seven." when it should have been cut by $20. DesRosiers also said giving up cost-of-living increases is not significant when inflation is nearly non-existent and added that the 40-hour reduction in paid time off merely means "five fewer spa days." University of Toronto professor Joe D'Cruz calculated that it would save $148 million a year, though GM is seeking $6 billion in Canadian government support. CAW autoworkers with seniority were able to maintain 10 weeks of vacation with full pay, while not contributing to their pension fund, relying instead on taxpayers (including these without pensions) to help make up their unfunded liabilities.

The agreement is contingent on Canada being allocated 20% of GM's North American, and getting billions of dollars in federal and provincial taxpayer support, which Lewenza stressed will be loans. However, some suggested that this would not be the final time that automakers would request a bailout. Dennis DesRosiers estimated that GM will go through its government loans in a couple of quarters, long before any recovery in the market. Furthermore, GM Canada president Arturo Elias had admitted to MP Frank Valeriote that GM had pledged all its assets worldwide to the US government in order to secure the first tranche of a US$30 billion loan, leaving no assets to collateralize the $6 billion loan from the Canadian government. The Canadian Taxpayers' Federation noted that between 1982 and 2005, Ottawa handed out over $18.2 billion to corporations, of which only $7.1 billion was repayable, and only $1.3 billion was ever repaid.

Chrysler vice-chairman and president Thomas W. LaSorda (himself the son of a CAW official) and Ford's chief of manufacturing Joe Hinrichs said that the GM-CAW deal was insufficient, suggesting that they would break the CAW's negotiating pattern set by GM. LaSorda told the House of Commons of Canada finance committee that he would demand an hourly wage cut of $20, suggested that Chrysler may withdraw from Canada if it fails to achieve more substantial cost savings from the CAW.

On March 31, 2009, the Canadian federal and Ontario governments jointly rejected the restructuring plans submitted by GM and Chrysler. This came a day after US President Barack Obama had rejected the plans of their parent companies. Both federal Industry Minister Tony Clement and Ontario Premier Dalton McGuinty suggested the CAW's initial deal was insufficient in cutting costs and the union had to return to the bargaining table to make further concessions. Both governments maintained that these were needed to make the business viable in order justify the use of taxpayers' money. Fiat CEO Sergio Marchionne has asked that CAW wages be reduced to the levels of non-unionized workers from Honda and Toyota operating in Canada, or else they would walk away from the proposed alliance with Chrysler, resulting in the latter being forced into bankruptcy. Following its emergence from Chapter 11, Chrysler returned to profitability, repaying some of its government loans.

=== Unifor and the 2013 Merger ===
Following a vote by the Canadian Auto Workers in October 2012 to merge with the Communications, Energy and Paperworkers Union of Canada (CEP), the independent operations of the CAW formally concluded on September 1, 2013. During a founding convention held in Toronto, approximately 2,500 delegates representing both organizations approved the merger with a 96 percent majority, resulting in the creation of a new national union named Unifor.

Jerry Dias, who had previously served as an assistant to the CAW national president, was elected as the first president of the integrated entity, while the final CAW president, Ken Lewenza, officially retired. At its inception, Unifor incorporated 300,000 members from the CAW and CEP’s respective jurisdictions in manufacturing, energy, and transportation. This restructuring consolidated the assets and bargaining units of both unions under a single administrative framework, marking the end of the CAW’s 28-year history as a standalone organization.

== CAW leaders ==
Canadian Directors of the UAW

- Charles Millard (1937–1939)
- George Burt (1939–1968)
- Dennis McDermott (1968–1978)
- Bob White (1978–1985)

Presidents of the Canadian Auto Workers

- Bob White (1985–1992)
- Buzz Hargrove (1992–2008)
- Ken Lewenza (2008–2013)

== Major CAW employers ==
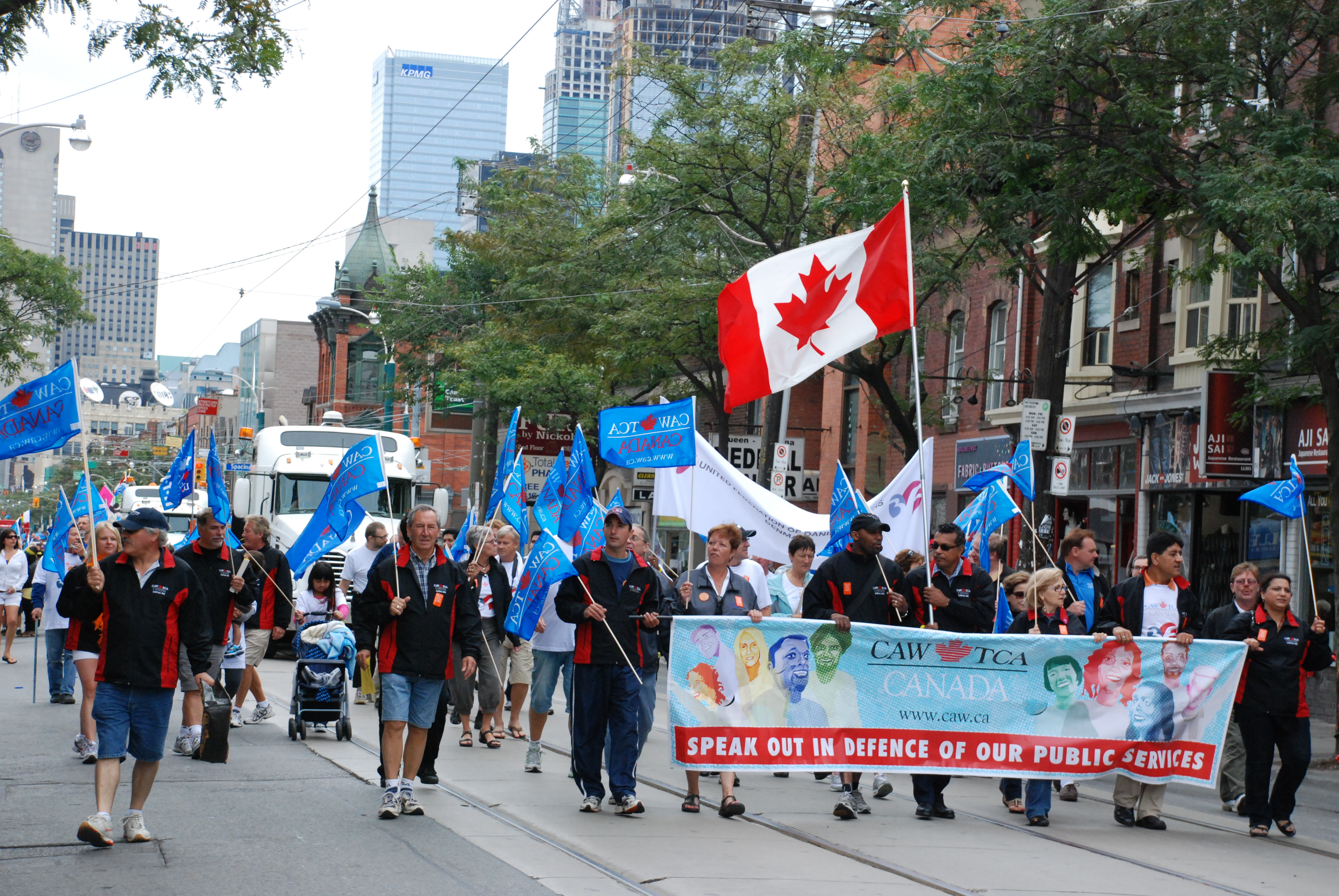
CAW members marching in the 2011 Labour Day parade in Toronto

=== Major auto ===
- General Motors of Canada – Local 195, 199, 222, 636, 1001,
- Ford Motor Company of Canada – Local 200, 240, 707, 1520 CAW Local 584
- Chrysler Canada – Local 144, 195, 432, 444, 1090, 1285, 1459,
- CAMI Automotive – Local 88

=== Aerospace ===
- Pratt and Whitney – Local 510
- Bombardier/de Havilland – Local 112
- Boeing Canada – Local 1967, CAW Local 2169
- CMC Electronics
- IMP Group
- Magellan Aerospace/Bristol – Local 3005
- Cascade Aerospace Inc - CAW Local 114

=== Specialty vehicles ===
- GM/General Dynamics (London) – Local 27
- Bombardier (Thunder Bay/Kingston)
- New Flyer Industries (Winnipeg) – Local 3003
- Paccar/Kenworth (Que.)
- Hitachi Construction Truck Manu (Guelph, Ontario) - CAW Local 1917

=== Shipbuilding ===
- Halifax Shipyard– CAW/MWF Local 1
- Marystown Shipyard
- Shelburne Ship Repair

=== Electrical and electronics ===
- Camco
- General Electric– Local 3003
- Westinghouse
- Nortel Networks

=== General manufacturing ===
- 3M Canada - CAW Local 27
- Collins and Aikman Plastics
- MTD Products
- Atlas Steels
- Collins and Aikman Plastics
- Honeywell Specialty Chemicals Amherstburg — Local 89
- Kautex Textron
- McGregor Hosiery Mills – Local 40
- Parmalat – Local 462
- Nestlé Enterprises – Local 252
- Bazaar and Novelty – Local 462
- Guelph Products
- LTV Copperweld – Local 636
- PepsiCo Foods – Local 1996
- St. Anne Nackawic Pulp Co. – Local 219
- Scanwood Canada Ltd. - National Council 4000
- Selkirk Canada Corporation Stoney Creek facility – Local 504
- RockTenn - (Guelph, ON) - CAW Local 1917
- CPK Interior Products - (CPK IP) - (Guelph, ON) CAW Local 1917
- Concast Pipe - (Guelph, ON) - CAW Local 1917
- Ventra Plastics - (Peterborough, ON) CAW Local 1987

=== Air transportation ===
- Air Canada and Regional – Local 2002
- Nav Canada – Local 2245, 5454, 1016
- Worldwide Flight Services– Local 2002
- Handlex (Air Transat) – Local 2002
- First Air – Local 2002

=== Railways ===
- Canadian National Railway – Local 100, National Council 4000
- Canadian Pacific Railway – Local 101, 103,104
- Ontario Northland Railway - Local 102
- Savage Alberta Railway – National Council 4000
- Toronto Terminal Railways - National Council 4000
- Via Rail Canada – National Council 4000, Local 100
- WABCO Stoney Creek – CAW Local 558

=== Marine transportation ===
- Bay Ferries, Saint John, NB-Digby, NS - Local 4404
- St. Lawrence Seaway – Local 4212
- Marine Atlantic
- Clipper Navigation, 1000A Wharf St and 254 Belleville St, Victoria, BC - Local 114

=== Other transportation ===
- Coast Mountain Bus Company, Greater Vancouver – Local 111, 2200
- CN Transportation Ltd. (CNTL – trucking) – National Council 4000
- CN Intermodal - National Council 4000
- DHL (Loomis) Courier – Local 114, 144, 4050, 4278, National Council 4000
- Durham Region Transit - Local 222
- Grand River Transit - Local 4304
- Laidlaw (carrier and transit) – Local 195, 4268
- Blue Line Taxi, Ottawa
- Waste Management Inc – Local 4050, 4209, 4268
- BC Transit, Victoria – Local 333
- Reimer Express Lines – Local 4209
- Brinks - CAW Local 504
- Securicor Cash Services – Local 114

=== Fisheries ===
- East Coast fish harvesters – FFAW/CAW
- East Coast fish plant workers – FFAW/CAW
- West Coast fish harvesters and fish plant workers (UFAWU)
- Great Lakes fish harvesters and fish plant workers – Local 444

=== Mining and smelting ===
- Xstrata – Local 598
- Xstrata Kidd Metallurgical Site – Local 599
- Alcan – Local 2301
- NVI Mining – Local 3019
- Windsor Salt Mine – Local 1959
- Gibraltar Mines – Local 3018

=== Hospitality and gaming ===
- Fairmont Hotels – Local 4050, 4275, 4276, 4534
- Delta Hotels
- Caesars Windsor – Local 444
- White Spot
- Radisson Hotels – Local 195, 3000, 4209
- Kentucky Fried Chicken – Local 3000
- Rocky Mountain Catering Co. Ltd. - National Council 4000
- Sheraton Hotels and Resorts
- Northern Lights Casino
- Marriott Hotels
- World Trade and Convention Centre Halifax - National Council 4000
- Great Blue Heron Casino Port Perry - Local 1090
- Elements Casino Brantford – Local 504

=== Retail and wholesale trade ===
- Atlantic Wholesalers (Loblaw Companies) Moncton - National Council 4000
- The Coca-Cola Company Local 973 (Brampton and Hamilton), Local 350 (Edmonton), Local 126 (Weston)
- Dominion Stores/A&P Canada/Superfresh – Local 414
- Food Basics – Local 414
- Loblaws – Local 414
- No Frills – Local 414
- PharmaPlus
- Results 360 Moncton Logistics Inc. (Freezer warehouse logistics) - Moncton - National Council 4000
- Sav-a-Centre – Local 414
- Sears Canada
- The Bay/Zellers – Local 240
- Valu-mart – Local 414
- Your Independent Grocer - Local 414

=== Health care ===
- Cape Breton District Health Authority
- St. Joseph's Health Care, London– Local 27
- Versa Care Homes – Local 302, 830, 2458
- London Health Sciences Centre
- Grand River Hospital – Local 302
- Camp Hill Medical Centre, Halifax
- Extendicare Homes – Local 302, 830, 1120, 2458
- Homes for the Aged, Thunder Bay– Local 229
- Glazier Health Centre, Oshawa- Local 1136
- Sault Area Hospitals – Local 1120
- Hôtel-Dieu Grace Healthcare,– Local 2458
- Windsor Regional Hospital – Local 2458
- Northwood Care, Halifax - CAW Local 4606
- St. Joseph's Care Group, Thunder Bay– Local 27, 229, 598, 1120
- Ornge – Local 2002

=== General services ===
- Allstream (formerly AT&T Canada)
- Green Shield Services– Local 240
- McMaster University - CAW Local 555
- Montreal-area auto dealerships
- Nova Scotia Federation of Labour Support Staff - National Council 4000
- Scandinavian Centre (B.C.)
- University of Manitoba - Local 3007
- University of Windsor – Local 2458
- Windsor Star – Local 240

== Related subjects ==
=== Films ===
CAW President Bob White plays a major role in the 1985 documentary film: Final Offer by Sturla Gunnarsson & Robert Collision. It follows the 1984 contract negotiations with General Motors that saw the CAW's birth, and split with the UAW. It's an interesting look at life on the shop floor of a car factory, along with the art of business negotiation.

=== Donation to the University of Windsor ===
The CAW Local 200 donated over $4 million towards the renovation of the University of Windsor's student union building, which was renamed the CAW Student Centre in 1991 as recognition of the gift.

== See also ==
- CAW Locals
