= R v Advance Cutting & Coring Ltd =

Canadian labour law case (SCC)

- Supreme Court of Canada

Hearing: March 20, 2000 Judgment: October 19, 2001
- Citations: [2001] 3 SCR 209, 2001 SCC 70
- Docket No.: 26664
- Prior history: On appeal from the Quebec Court of Appeal

Holding
- Quebec's law requiring trade union membership for employees in the construction industry did not violate the Charter

Court membership
- Chief Justice: Beverley McLachlin; Puisne Justices: Claire L'Heureux-Dubé, Charles Gonthier, Frank Iacobucci, John C. Major, Michel Bastarache, Ian Binnie, Louise Arbour, Louis LeBel

Reasons given
- Plurality: LeBel J., joined by Gonthier and Arbour JJ.
- Concurrence: L'Heureux-Dubé J.
- Concurrence: Iacobucci J.
- Dissent: Bastarache J., joined by McLachlin C.J. and Major and Binnie JJ.

Laws applied
- Canadian Charter of Rights and Freedoms, s. 2(d)

R v Advance Cutting & Coring Ltd [2001] 3 S.C.R. 113, 2001 SCC 679 is a Canadian labour law case concerning compulsory trade union membership in the Quebec construction industry. The Supreme Court of Canada considered the application of section 2(d) of the Canadian Charter of Rights and Freedoms to the Quebec law in question. A divided Court affirmed the law's constitutionality.

== Background ==
In 1991, the Supreme Court decided Lavigne v Ontario Public Service Employees Union. The Court in that case split regarding the existence, scope and extent of a "freedom from compelled association", although the majority held that such a right was protected by section 2(d) of the Charter.

At issue in Advance Cutting was a Quebec law requiring employees in the construction industry to obtain a competency certificate; the issuance of a competency certificate was linked to an employee's membership in a designated trade union.

The appellants were contractors, real estate promoters and construction workers who had been convicted of violating the relevant law. Specifically, the employers hired workers without the requisite competency certificates, and the employees engaged in work in the industry without the proper competency certificates. At trial, they challenged the law in question as violating their Charter right to freedom from compelled association.

== Procedural history ==
At trial, a judge of the Court of Quebec dismissed the constitutional argument, and entered convictions. On appeal, this holding was affirmed by the Superior Court of Quebec. A further appeal to the Quebec Court of Appeal was likewise dismissed, finding no breach of section 2(d). The appellants were granted leave to appeal to the Supreme Court of Canada on the section 2(d) issue. As in the courts below, the issue of mobility rights under section 6 of the Charter were not litigated before the Supreme Court.

== Judgment ==
A majority of the Court rejected the constitutional argument and agreed that the appeal should be dismissed, but for different reasons. Justice LeBel, joined by Justices Gonthier and Arbour, found no breach of section 2(d). The plurality affirmed that the Charter guarantees freedom from "compelled association", but found that the Quebec legislation in question did not infringe this right: it did not impose "ideological conformity" on the appellants.

Justice Iacobucci concurred in the result, agreeing that the Charter encompassed a negative right to be free from association. He found that the law at issue infringed section 2(d), but that the infringement was justified under section 1 of the Charter.

Justice L'Hereux-Dubé also concurred, but cited Justice Wilson's opinion in Lavigne to conclude "that s. 2(d) includes only the positive freedom to associate". Her opinion was unique in declining to recognize a Charter-protected freedom from compelled association.

Three justices (Chief Justice McLachlin and Justices Major and Binnie) joined Justice Bastarache in dissent. The dissenting justices agreed that the Charter protected against compelled association. They found that the law in question infringed section 2(d) in a manner that could not be justified under section 1.

== Commentary ==
Writing in the Supreme Court Law Review, one author commented that Advance Cutting, among other labour law cases, "may also have implications that extend beyond the constitutionalization of labour relations", observing that the Court emphasized "collective interests over individual rights to uphold a legislative scheme which imposed serious constraints on section 2(d)'s negative and positive entitlements."

Another commentator opined that "the 'freedom to not associate' cases, Lavigne and Advance Cutting, involving challenges to union security agreements or laws, represent successes for unions in Charter litigation which were rare at the time they were decided."

== See also ==
- Lavigne v Ontario Public Service Employees Union
- List of Supreme Court of Canada cases (McLachlin Court)
- Canadian labour law
- Right-to-work law, American labour laws guaranteeing an employee's right to refrain from paying or being a member of a union
