= Canadian labour law =

Canadian labour law is that body of law which regulates the rights, restrictions, and obligations of trade unions, workers, and employers in Canada.

== Overview ==
The federal, provincial, and territorial governments all regulate labour and employment law in Canada, with the federal government regulating a few particular economic sectors and the provinces and territories regulating all others. The constitution gives exclusive federal jurisdiction over employment as a component of its regulatory authority for specific industries, including banking, radio and TV broadcasting, inland and maritime navigation and shipping, inland and maritime fishing, as well as any form of transportation that crosses provincial boundaries (essentially aviation and rail transport but not highways). Employment outside of federally regulated industries falls under provincial authority for most civil (including contract) law. Territories generally have similar powers as provinces but by those powers are delegated by federal statute (not constitutionally guaranteed), can be less extensive in scope, differ for each of the three territories, are subject to change accruing over time, and also interact to a large extent with Inuit, Métis and First Nations governments. Unless under federal jurisdiction, the laws which are in effect are those of the province or territory where the employment takes place (rather than the employee's home or the employer's head office).

Canada's varied labour laws are a result of its geography, historical, and cultural variety. This expressed in law through the treaty-/land-based rights of individual indigenous nations, the distinct French-derived law system of Quebec, and the differing labour codes of each of the provinces and territories.

In areas of exclusive provincial jurisdiction, each province (and increasingly each territory) has authority to regulate . So, for example, education (except education on First Nation reserves) and municipal government are both subject to provincial legislation (the territories excepted).

While Quebec's statutory environment is considerably different in many respects, most provinces and the federal Code all follow the standard of enterprise-based bargaining structures. They also share a certification process (the details of which differ somewhat from province to province) through which unions are recognized by the state as having the support of a majority of workers in a narrowly defined workplace.

One feature common to all provincial and federal labour laws is the "Rand Formula". This legal concept allows employees in unionized workplaces to decline union membership, but requires them to pay the equivalent of basic union dues even if they decide not to be union members.

== Strikes ==
The right of workers to strike and picket against their employer is constitutionally protected in Canada, according to the Supreme Court of Canada's 2015 ruling in Saskatchewan Federation of Labour v Saskatchewan.

The right to strike is an essential part of a meaningful collective bargaining process in our system of labour relations... This crucial role in collective bargaining is why the right to strike is constitutionally protected by s. 2 (d). [of the Canadian Constitution].

=== Picketing ===
The law concerning the granting of injunctions that limit picketing during strikes varies from province to province, and is largely case law rather than statutory.

== Provincial frameworks ==
=== Alberta ===
In Alberta, labour law has legislation like the Employment Standards Code, the Labour Relations Code, and the Restoring Balance in Alberta’s Workplaces Act (commonly called Bill 32). Under this framework: there is a minimum wage set (currently $15/hour for most workers), rules about hours of work, rest breaks, holidays, and job-protected leaves. Bill 32 introduces major changes: for example, it allows averaging of overtime over long periods (up to 52 weeks), gives employers more power to set schedules and changes rest-break requirements, and adjusts the rules for final pay after employment ends.

=== British Colombia ===
In 2002, the British Columbia government changed the Employment Standards Branch, replacing the investigation system that used to reply to labour law violations with an 18-page "Self-Help Kit" and mediation process. However, this has been criticized as changing the government's role "from enforcers of labour standards to being wage dispute resolvers."

- Health Services and Support-Facilities Subsector Bargaining Association v British Columbia [2007]
- Fraser v. Ontario (Attorney General) [2011]

=== Nova Scotia ===
In 2024, Nova Scotia passed the Stronger Workplaces for Nova Scotia Act. Key new provisions include a “duty to cooperate” between injured workers and employers to support safe, timely return to work; expanded unpaid leave entitlements (for example, leave for serious illness or injury of up to 27 weeks); recognition of psychological as well as physical health and safety; and requirement that employers implement policies to prevent harassment in the workplace.

=== Ontario ===
In Ontario, most workers are protected by the Employment Standards Act (ESA), which sets minimums for things like minimum wage, how often you get paid, how many hours you can be asked to work, overtime, vacation pay, public holidays, and different kinds of leaves (e.g. pregnancy & parental leave, sick leave, bereavement leave, family medical leave, etc.).

=== Québec ===
In Québec, the Labour Standards Act covers basic rights like work hours, overtime pay, holidays, and vacation. The Occupational Health and Safety Act makes sure workplaces are safe, while the Pay Equity Act helps reduce unfair pay differences between men and women. In 2024–2025, new laws such as Bill 42 (on harassment from anyone at work, including customers) and Bill 101 (to speed up dispute cases) made protections stronger. Complaints and disputes are usually handled by the Administrative Labour Tribunal (Tribunal administratif du travail) or the CNESST, the main agency for workplace rights.

=== Yukon ===
In Yukon, the Employment Standards Act defines the basic rights and protections for most employees. These include minimum wage, limits on hours of work and overtime, vacation pay and general holidays, job-protected leaves such as maternity and parental leave, and special leave for illness or death in the family.

== Back to work legislation ==
The federal and provincial governments have had the ability to introduce "back-to-work legislation", a special law that blocks the strike action (or a lockout) from happening or continuing. Canadian governments could also have imposed binding arbitration or a new contract on the disputing parties. Back-to-work legislation was first used in 1950 during a railway strike, and as of 2012 had been used 33 times by the federal government for those parts of the economy that are regulated federally (grain handling, rail and air travel, and the postal service), and in more cases provincially. In addition, certain parts of the economy can be proclaimed "essential services" in which case all strikes are illegal.

On 30 January 2015, the Supreme Court of Canada ruled in Saskatchewan Federation of Labour v Saskatchewan that there is a constitutional right to strike. In this 5–2 majority decision, Justice Rosalie Abella ruled that "[a]long with their right to associate, speak through a bargaining representative of their choice, and bargain collectively with their employer through that representative, the right of employees to strike is vital to protecting the meaningful process of collective bargaining…" [paragraph 24]. This decision adopted the dissent by Chief Justice Brian Dickson in a 1987 Supreme Court ruling on a reference case brought by the province of Alberta (Reference Re Public Service Employee Relations Act (Alta)). The exact scope of this right to strike remains unclear.

Federal legislation classified as "back to work" legislation by the Parliament of Canada
| Legislation | Citation | Royal assent | Bill citation |
|---|---|---|---|
| Port of Montreal Operations Act, 2021 | S.C. 2021, c. 6 | 2021-04-30 | Bill C-29 |
| Postal Services Resumption and Continuation Act | S.C. 2018, c. 25 | 2018-11-26 | Bill C-89 |
| Protecting Air Service Act | S.C. 2012, c. 2 | 2012-03-15 | Bill C-33 |
| Restoring Rail Service Act | S.C. 2012, c. 8 | 2012-05-31 | Bill C-39 |
| Continuing Air Service for Passengers Act | N/A (bill not proceeded with) | | Bill C-5 |
| Restoring Mail Delivery for Canadians Act | S.C. 2011, c. 17 | 2011-06-26 | Bill C-6 |
| Railway Continuation Act, 2009 | N/A (bill not proceeded with) | | Bill C-61 |
| Railway Continuation Act, 2007 | S.C. 2007, c. 8 | 2007-04-18 | Bill C-46 |
| Government Services Act, 1999 | S.C. 1999, c. 13 | 1999-03-25 | Bill C-76 |
| Postal Services Continuation Act, 1997 | S.C. 1994, c. 34 | 1997-12-03 | Bill C-24 |
| West Coast Ports Operations Act | S.C. 1994, c. 1 | 1994-02-08 | Bill C-312 |
| West Coast Ports Operations Act, 1995 | S.C. 1994, c. 2 | 1995-03-16 | Bill C-74 |
| Maintenance of Railway Operations Act, 1995 | S.C. 1995, c. 6 | 1982-11-03 | Bill C-77 |
| British Columbia Grain Handling Operations Act | S.C. 1991, c. 25 | 1991-06-14 | |
| Public Sector Compensation Act | S.C. 1991, c. 30 | 1991-10-02 | |
| Thunder Bay Grain Handling Operations Act | S.C. 1991, c. 31 | 1991-10-11 | |
| Postal Services Continuation Act | S.C. 1991, c. 35 | 1991-10-29 | |
| Government Services Resumption Act | S.C. 1989, c. 24 | 1989-12-15 | |
| Prince Rupert Grain Handling Operations Act | S.C. 1988, c. 1 | 1988-01-20 | |
| Maintenance of Ports Operations Act, 1986 | S.C. 1986, c. 46 | 1986-11-18 | |
| Maintenance of Railway Operations Act, 1987 | S.C. 1987, c. 36 | 1987-08-28 | |
| Postal Services Continuation Act, 1987 | S.C. 1987, c. 40 | 1987-10-16 | |
| West Coast Ports Operations Act, 1982 | S.C. 1980-81-82, c. 126 | 1982-11-03 | |
| Shipping Continuation Act | S.C. 1978-79, c. 2 | 1978-10-23 | |
| Postal Services Continuation Act | S.C. 1978-79, c. 1 | 1997-12-03 | |
| Port of Halifax Operations Act | S.C. 1976-77, c. 1 | 1976-10-22 | |
| Air Traffic Control Services Continuation Act | S.C. 1976-77, c. 57 | 1977-08-09 | |
| West Coast Grain Handling Operations Act, 1974 | S.C. 1974-75-76, c. 1 | 1974-10-10 | |
| West Coast Ports Operations Act, 1975 | S.C. 1974-75-76, c. 32 | 1975-03-24 | |
| St. Lawrence Ports Operation Act, 1975 | S.C. 1974-75-76, c. 39 | 1975-04-24 | |
| Maintenance of Railway Operations Act, 1973 | S.C. 1973-74, c. 32 | 1973-08-31 | |
| St. Lawrence Ports Operations Act | S.C. 1972, c. 22 | 1972-07-07 | |
| West Coast Ports Operations Act | S.C. 1972, c. 23 | 1972-09-01 | |
| St. Lawrence Ports Working Conditions Act | S.C. 1967, c. 49 | 1966-07-14 | |
| Maintenance of Railway Operation Act, 1966 | S.C. 1966-67, c. 50 | 1966-09-01 | |
| Maritime Transportation Union Trustees Act | S.C. 1963, c. 17 | 1963-10-18 | |
| Railway Operations Continuation Act | S.C. 1960-61, c. 2 | 1960-12-02 | |
| British Columbia Coast Steamship Service Act | S.C. 1958, c. 7 | 1958-07-25 | |
| Maintenance of Railway Operation Act | S.C. 1950-51, c. 1 | 1950-08-30 | |

Ontario provincial back to work legislation
| Legislation | Citation | Royal assent | Bill citation | Ref. |
|---|---|---|---|---|
| Toronto Public Transit Service Resumption Act, 2008 | S.O. 2008, c. 4 | 2008-04-27 | Bill 66 | |
| Colleges of Applied Arts and Technology Labour Dispute Resolution Act, 2017 | S.O. 2017, c. 21 | 2017-11-19 | Bill 178 | |
| City of Toronto Labour Disputes Resolution Act, 2002 | S.O. 2002, c. 11 | 2002-07-11 | Bill 174 | |
| York University Labour Disputes Resolution Act, 2009 | S.O. 2009, c. 1 | 2009-01-29 | Bill 145 | |
| Toronto Transit Commission Labour Disputes Resolution Act, 2011 | S.O. 2011, c. 2 | 2011-03-30 | Bill 150 | |
| Public Sector Transition Stability Act, 1997 | S.O. 1997, c. 21 | 1997-10-10 | Bill 136 | |

Quebec provincial back to work legislation
| Legislation | Citation | Royal assent | Bill citation | Ref. |
|---|---|---|---|---|
| An Act to give greater consideration to the needs of the population in the event of a strike or a lock-out | N/A (bill pending) | | Bill 89 | |
| An Act to ensure resumption of the regular maritime transport services provided by Relais Nordik inc. and to settle the dispute between that company and some of its employees | S.Q. 2016, c. 20 | 2016-06-10 | Bill 111 | |
| An Act to ensure the resumption of work in the construction industry and the settlement of disputes for the renewal of the collective agreements, SQ 2017, c 9 | S.Q. 2017, c. 9 | 2017-05-30 | Bill 142 | |
| An Act respecting the resumption of work in the construction industry | S.Q. 2013, c. 20 | 2013-07-01 | Bill 54 | |
| An Act respecting the resumption of normal public transport service in the territory of the Société de transport de la Communauté urbaine de Québec | S.Q. 2000, c. 51 | 2000-12-05 | Bill 183 | |
| An Act to order the resumption of certain road freight transport services | S.Q. 2000, c. 38 | 2000-11-02 | Bill 157 | |

British Columbia provincial back to work legislation
| Legislation | Citation | Royal assent | Bill citation | Ref. |
|---|---|---|---|---|
| University of British Columbia Services Continuation Act | S.B.C. 2003, c. 10 | 2003-03-12 | Bill 21 | |
| Health Care Services Continuation Act | S.B.C. 2001 c. 23 | 2001-06-20 | | |
| Crown Counsel Agreement Continuation Act | S.B.C. 2005 c. 4 | 2005-03-03 | | |

Saskatchewan provincial back to work legislation
| Legislation | Citation | Royal assent | Bill citation | Ref. |
|---|---|---|---|---|
| An Act to provide for the Resumption of Instruction, Teaching and Examination of Students at The University of Saskatchewan | S.S. 1988-89, c U-7.1 | 1988-04-08 | | |
| An Act to provide for the Resumption of Operations of Dairy Producers Co-operative Limited and Palm Dairies Limited | S.S. 1979-80, c M-1.1 | 1980-05-09 | | |
| An Act to provide for the Resumption of Operations of Dairy Producers Co-operative Limited and Palm Dairies Limited | S.S. 1983-84, c. D-1.1 | 1984-04-09 | | |
| The Resumption of Services (Nurses - SUN) Act | S.S. 1999, c R-22.001 | 1999-04-08 | Bill 23 | |

Alberta provincial back to work legislation
| Legislation | Citation | Royal assent | Bill citation | Ref. |
|---|---|---|---|---|
| Public Sector Services Continuation Act | S.A. 2013, c. p-41.5 | 2013-12-11 | Bill 45 | |
| Health Services Continuation Act | S.A. 1982, c. 21 | 1982-03-10 | Bill 11 | |

New Brunswick provincial back to work legislation
| Legislation | Citation | Royal assent | Bill citation | Ref. |
|---|---|---|---|---|
| An Act to Amend an Act to Ensure Resumption and Continuation of Certain Non-Teaching Services in the Public Service | S.N.B. 1982, c. 21 | 1982-06-17 | Bill 18 | |
| An Act to Ensure the Continuation of Certain Public Services in the Public Service | S.N.B. 2001, c. 1 | 2001-03-05 | Bill 30 | |

Newfoundland and Labrador provincial back to work legislation
| Legislation | Citation | Royal assent | Bill citation | Ref. |
|---|---|---|---|---|
| Public Services Resumption and Continuation Act | S.N.L 2004, c P-44.1 | 2004-05-04 | Bill 18 | |
| Health and Community Services Resumption and Continuation Act | S.N.L. 1999, c H-37.2 | 1999-04-01 | | |

Nova Scotia provincial back to work legislation
| Legislation | Citation | Royal assent | Bill citation | Ref. |
|---|---|---|---|---|
| Ambulance Services Continuation (2013) Act | S.N.S. 2013, c. 31 | 2013-07-05 | Bill 86 | |
| Healthcare Services Continuation (2001) Act | S.N.S. 2001, c. 27 | 2001-06-27 | Bill 68 | |

== See also ==
- Canada Labour Code
- Employment Standards Act of British Columbia
- Employment Standards Act (Ontario)
- Ontario v Fraser (2011)
- UK labour law
- United States labor law
