= Ontario v Fraser =

Canadian labour and constitutional law case

- Supreme Court of Canada

Hearing: December 17, 2009 Judgment: April 29, 2011
- Full case name: Ontario (Attorney General) v Fraser
- Citations: [2011] 2 SCR 3, 2011 SCC 20
- Prior history: On appeal from the Ontario Court of Appeal
- Ruling: Appeal by the Attorney General of Ontario allowed, action dismissed

Holding
- Government action that makes good-faith collective bargaining effectively impossible will substantially interfere with freedom of association, infringing section 2(d) of the Canadian Charter of Rights and Freedoms

Court membership
- Chief Justice: Beverly McLachlin
- Puisne Justices: Ian Binnie, Louis LeBel, Marie Deschamps, Morris Fish, Rosalie Abella, Louise Charron, Marshall Rothstein, Thomas Cromwell

Reasons given
- Majority: McLachlin and LeBel, joined by Binnie, Fish and Cromwell
- Concurrence: Rothstein, joined by Charron
- Concurrence: Deschamps
- Dissent: Abella

Laws applied
- Canadian Charter of Rights and Freedoms, section 2(d)

Ontario (Attorney General) v Fraser [2011] 2 SCR 3 is a Canadian labour law case concerning the protection of collective bargaining under section 2(d) of the Canadian Charter of Rights and Freedoms. At issue was an Ontario law that created a separate labour relations regime for agricultural workers. The court considered the standard for establishing a breach of section 2(d) in cases where government action is alleged to interfere with collective bargaining rights. A majority of the court upheld the law, finding no breach of sections 2(d) or 15 of the Charter.

The decision was regarded as significant for clarifying the scope of protection for union activity under the Charter. However, uncertainty persisted, and some observers viewed Fraser as narrowing the scope of protection for collective bargaining.

== Background ==
The interpretation of section 2(d) underwent significant evolution in the years prior to Fraser. Beginning with the Reference Re Public Service Employee Relations Act (Alta), the Supreme Court construed freedom of association as an individual right; in that case, the SCC indicated that collective bargaining was not subject to constitutional protection.

Dunmore v Ontario (AG) was decided in 2001, and introduced broader protections for collective action by employees. In Dunmore, the SCC focused the section 2(d) analysis on whether the government action at issue "discourag[ed] the collective pursuit of common goals". The SCC in that case struck down an Ontario law which excluded agricultural workers from collective bargaining.

In response to Dunmore, the government of Ontario passed new legislation to regulate agricultural labour relations. This legislation did not provide for collective bargaining per se, but allowed for agricultural workers to form employee associations. These associations could "make representations" to the employer, which the employer was obliged to receive and consider.

Individual claimants and the United Food and Commercial Workers brought a constitutional challenge to the new Ontario legislation, arguing that it infringed their rights under section 2(d).

=== Procedural history ===
At trial, the Ontario Superior Court of Justice dismissed the claim. However, the SCC subsequently released its decision in Health Services and Support – Facilities Subsector Bargaining Assn. v British Columbia, significantly revising the interpretation of section 2(d) and expanding the scope of protections under that provision.

An appeal to the Ontario Court of Appeal was unanimously allowed, and the trial ruling set aside. Applying BC Health Services, the Ontario Court of Appeal found that the challenged legislation substantially interfered with collective bargaining rights, and that the infringement of section 2(d) could not be justified under section 1 of the Charter.

The Attorney General of Ontario was granted leave to appeal to the Supreme Court of Canada, which heard arguments in the case on December 17, 2009.

== Judgment ==
The Supreme Court of Canada allowed the AGO's appeal, upholding Ontario's law by an 8–1 majority. The court produced four sets of reasons: a majority opinion, two concurrences, and a dissent.

The majority opinion was written by Chief Justice McLachlin and Justice LeBel. The majority considered calls to overturn BC Health Services, and declined to do so.

The majority proceeded to apply the BC Health Services framework to the Ontario law at issue. Regarding the legal test under section 2(d), the majority stated: "In every case, the question is whether the impugned law or state action has the effect of making it impossible to act collectively to achieve workplace goals." A law that had this effect would infringe section 2(d). However, applying this test, the majority found that the law in question did not infringe the Charter. The majority emphasized that section 2(d) "does not require a particular model of bargaining, nor a particular outcome."

Finding no breach of sections 2(d) or 15 of the Charter, the majority did not consider justification under section 1. The majority also dismissed the claimants' section 15 argument.

Justice Rothstein concurred in the result, and his reasons were joined by Justice Charron. Justice Rothstein stated that BC Health Services was wrongly decided, and called for it to be overturned. He would have declined to recognize any constitutional right to good-faith collective bargaining, and allowed the AGO's appeal on that basis. Justice Rothstein agreed with the majority regarding their disposition of the section 15 argument.

Justice Deschamps filed a separate concurrence. She argued that the majority took too broad a view of BC Health Services, and reiterated her view that section 2(d) of the Charter did not mandate any particular statutory regime for collective bargaining: it merely protected "the freedom to engage in associational activities and the ability of employees to act in common to reach shared goals related to workplace issues and terms of employment." Justice Deschamps also dismissed the section 15 argument.

Justice Abella was the sole dissenter, finding an infringement of section 2(d). She found that the law in question did "not protect, and was never intended to protect, collective bargaining rights." Justice Abella emphasized the uniqueness of agricultural employment, and concluded that the law in question was not minimally impairing: it was "not tailored at all" to the government's objective in passing it, and so it could not be justified under section 1 of the Charter. Justice Abella did not comment on the section 15 argument, but did argue that the majority opinion failed to interpret section 2(d) in light of section 15 equality rights.

== Commentary ==
Writing for TheCourt.ca, Christopher Hunter observed that "Fraser both confuses and clarifies s. 2(d) jurisprudence". He noted the court's division regarding the "precise meaning of Health Services."

Other commentators described the holding in Fraser as narrowing the scope of protection afforded to collective bargaining under section 2(d). Alison Braley, writing in the McGill Law Journal, was critical of the majority reasons, writing that "Fraser undoubtedly provides a setback for workers' collective bargaining rights in Canada." In the Ottawa Law Review, Professor Brian Langille criticized the logic underpinning the majority's reasons, and the adoption of a "substantial impossibility" test in relation to constitutional rights. Professor Kenneth Thorncroft wrote that the majority "significantly narrowed the scope of Health Services and its expansive view (relative to the “labour trilogy” (Note: I.e., the 1987 trilogy of section 2(d) cases including the Alberta Reference.)) of Charter-protected associational rights in the context of public sector labour relations."

Hunter, on the other hand, did not see Fraser as indicating a retreat from the "progressive approach" to section 2(d) adopted in Dunmore and BC Health Services.

== Subsequent developments ==
In Mounted Police Association of Ontario v Canada, the SCC revisited its rulings in BC Health Services and Fraser. In that case, a majority of the SCC (Justice Rothstein dissenting) found that the governing test for infringement of section 2(d) was "substantial interference" with collective bargaining rights, and not "impossibility". In dissent, Justice Rothstein concluded that the majority was overturning Fraser, while the majority described its reasons as clarifying the existing test.

== See also ==
- List of Supreme Court of Canada cases (McLachlin Court)
- Canadian labour law
- Section 15 of the Canadian Charter of Rights and Freedoms
