= Ken Lewenza Sr. =

Canadian trade unionist (born 1954)

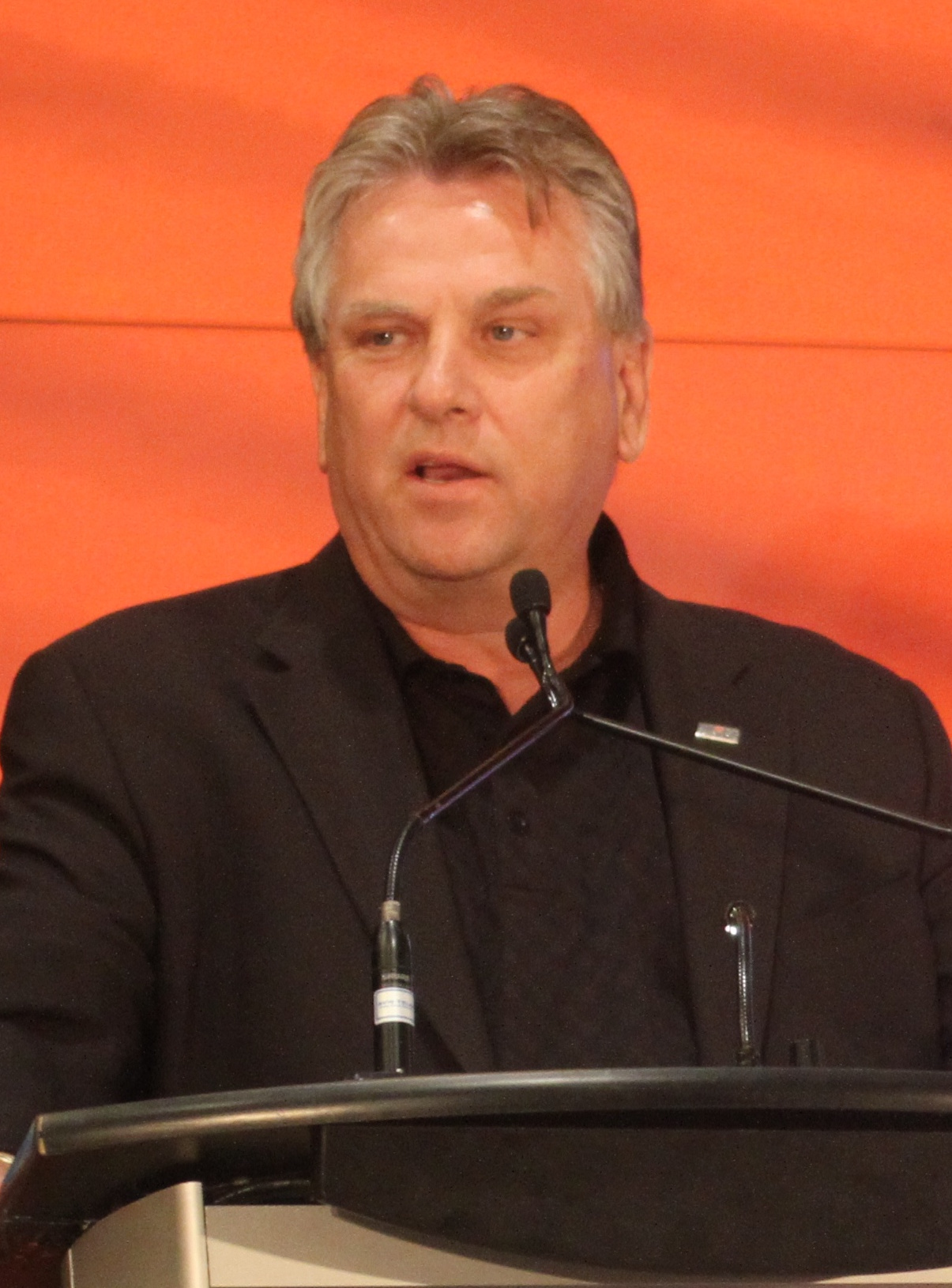
- Born: 1954 (age 71–72); Windsor, Ontario, Canada
- Occupation: Trade unionist

Ken Lewenza Sr. (born 1954 in Windsor, Ontario, Canada) was the National President of the Canadian Auto Workers union, having been acclaimed at that organization's national convention on September 6, 2008. He was previously the president of the Canadian Auto Workers, Local 444 in Windsor, Ontario, Canada. He replaced Buzz Hargrove as the union's national president.

Lewenza was born in Windsor, a middle child among eight. His father, Bill Lewenza, was a longtime steward and committeeman with Local 444.

Lewenza dropped out of high school after Grade 10, at age 16, worked in a gas station, married the next year, and had a son when he was still 17.

In 1972, he went from the $1.65-an-hour minimum wage job at the gas station, to a $4.48 job on the chassis line at Chrysler Canada's Windsor automobile assembly plant. For the first three years he was in the plant, Lewenza's father was still there, serving as a committeeman. His father advised Lewenza to be careful about getting involved in the union, urging him instead to focus on his young family.

Lewenza became an alternate to an elected steward, taking over for the steward whenever he was away from the job. That allowed Lewenza to prove himself to the other workers, and in 1978, he was elected a full-time steward.

Lewenza was elected committeeman in 1983, representing about 1,000 workers in the minivan plant, and plant chairman in 1987, around the time his father died. When local president Ken Gerard died suddenly in 1990, vice-president Larry Bauer took over as president and Lewenza became vice-president. When Bauer died four years later in 1994, Lewenza moved up once again, becoming the local's president.

As president of the local, Lewenza became a well-known figure in the Windsor-Essex area. He presided over five consecutive sets of negotiations with Chrysler as the chair of the CAW Chrysler Master Bargaining Committee.

Lewenza's son Ken Lewenza Jr. is a former city councillor in Windsor who representing Ward 4 from 2006 to 2010. Lewenza Jr. also works for Chrysler and is active with Local 444.

Preceded by Buzz Hargrove	National President of the CAW; 2008-2013	Succeeded by Position eliminated after CAW dissolved and merged into Unifor
