= CAW Local 1973 =

Canadian Auto Workers union

- Named after: 1973
- Predecessor: UAW Local 1973
- Established: January 1, 1973; 53 years ago
- Founders: Bob Longeuay, Jim Morand, Alix Sinkevitch, & George Ashton
- Dissolved: February 2013; 13 years ago
- Type: Trade union
- Location: Windsor, Ontario
- Origins: UAW Local 195
- Services: Represent workers at General Motors and Lear Corporation
- Fields: Manufacturing
- Key people: Alix Sinkevitch
- Parent organization: Canadian Auto Workers

Canadian Auto Workers Local 1973 was a local union affiliated Canadian Auto Workers.

== Beginnings ==
Keith Archer said "Canada's union movement has been fragmented along numerous dimensions" though Local 1973 did not become one of those dimensions until it became independent from Local 195 which both the Windsor General Motors Trim, now Lear, and Transmission Plants belonged to. Both plants wanted their own identity in the labour movement and as a result of the efforts of Bob Longeuay, Jim Morand, Alix Sinkevitch and George Ashton this goal was realized January 1, 1973 when Local 1973 was chartered.

A petition to separate that members had signed was sent to the United Auto Workers (UAW) and the wheels were set in motion to form the Local 1973. Longeuay, Morand, Sinkevitch and Ashton "…signed the original petition that went to the International UAW Executive Board, requesting a separate Windsor GM local…" reports the union biography. Another petition was held in 1972 as some did not like the idea of separation, although the petition held strong with 67.8% of GM workers voting in favour of the split. The first president of the UAW's newest local union was Alix Sinkevitch and he served as president from 1973 to 1981. Through the years there have been several executive board members with each contributing their own experience to the local's history. Local 1973 then needed a place to gather for their meetings and events and purchased a building on Walker Road to act as their Union Hall.

== Forming the CAW ==
A major change happened when the UAW broke with its parent organization and "…members overwhelmingly supported the split," forming the United Auto Workers Union of Canada. "In the summer of 1986 that name would officially be changed to the Canadian Auto Workers Union." When the split occurred and the Canadian Auto Workers Union (CAW) was formed the Windsor Local made the change with them becoming CAW Local 1973. The Local 1973 has a history of coming together to protest in solidarity.

A memorable time in Windsor labour history occurred in 1996 with the news that the Windsor GM Transmission Plant and the Oshawa Fabrication Plant were up for sale. A strike was threatened which General Motors had hoped to avoid. Though a protest was held in Oshawa at the GM headquarters workers went on strike April 22, 1996, which lasted until October 23, 1996, when a tentative agreement was reached. Local 1973 have been known to come out to show their support to other strikers as can be seen from January 14, 1998, when some members joined Via Rail picketers demonstrating against cutbacks. Also in 1998 the Local 1973 celebrated their 25th anniversary commemorating their independence from Local 195. Local 1973 have been active in raising funds for the United Way, organizing campaigns and acting as main contributors.

== Projects ==
When a recession occurred in 1981 many workers lost their jobs. Local 1973's Education Committee set out to help its Windsor workers as they themselves said "In 1991, when major layoffs hit the Windsor GM workers, the CAW Local 1973 Education Committee decided to pursue community help for our members." The Education Committee met with the United Way to help laid-off workers establishing a Help Fair. It had many supporters contributing to its success, the goal of giving out information and to "…keep the spirits up of laid off workers." The program was so successful that it spread throughout the province of Ontario.

With the program installed they claimed success with "…laid off workers received help and assurance when they needed it." Many union activities are participated in and put on by Local 1973 such as the annual Labour Day parades and the picnics in which workers and their families come together for a day of fun. Local 1973 has been an active member in union history and in the CAW and continues to grow.

== Closure ==
With General Motors' decision to close the transmission plant in 2010, and with the closure of the Lear plant, CAW Local 1973 closed in February 2013, and their building was sold shortly afterward.
