= Unifor Local 111 =

- Headquarters: New Westminster, British Columbia
- Location: Canada
- Members: 3300
- Key people: Mike McMillan (President); Harb Kular (First Vice President); Jason McCormick (Second Vice President); Jas Thind (Financial Secretary); Jessie Rana (Recording Secretary); Ray Beattie (Community Shuttle Executive Officer); Vanessa Caron (Office Admin); Jennifer Lashley (Office Admin)
- Parent organization: Unifor
- Website: www.unifor111.ca

Former logo as Canadian Auto Workers Local 111.

Unifor Local 111 is a local union of the general trade union Unifor. It represents conventional and community bus operators for Coast Mountain Bus Company in Metro Vancouver. It was founded as Canadian Auto Workers Local 111 from the remnants of the Independent Canadian Transit Union, which had acrimoniously broken from the U.S.-dominated Amalgamated Transit Union. ICTU was a maverick union, never part of the labour mainstream, and eventually the ICTU membership voted to reenter the labour establishment by joining the Canadian Auto Workers, which ironically broke from U.S.-dominated United Auto Workers about the same time ICTU came into being.

The union has pushed for changes in fare collection procedures on buses which would reduce confrontations between drivers and passengers.

It has had internal disagreements over the strategy of TransLink, the agency which funds transportation in Greater Vancouver.

There was a bitter strike in 2001.

The union convinced the B.C. Human Rights Tribunal to force the employer to discontinue an attendance management system which it claimed discriminated against employees with a disability.

== Political campaign ==
On October 21, 2008 the local launched a public awareness campaign calling for "More Buses Now". It is a campaign designed to draw attention to the public demands for more service in the Metro Vancouver area and is driven by leaflets, advertising, and the website MoreBusesNow.com.
