= 1945 Windsor Ford strike =

Auto workers' strike in Windsor, Ontario, Canada

1945 Ford strike
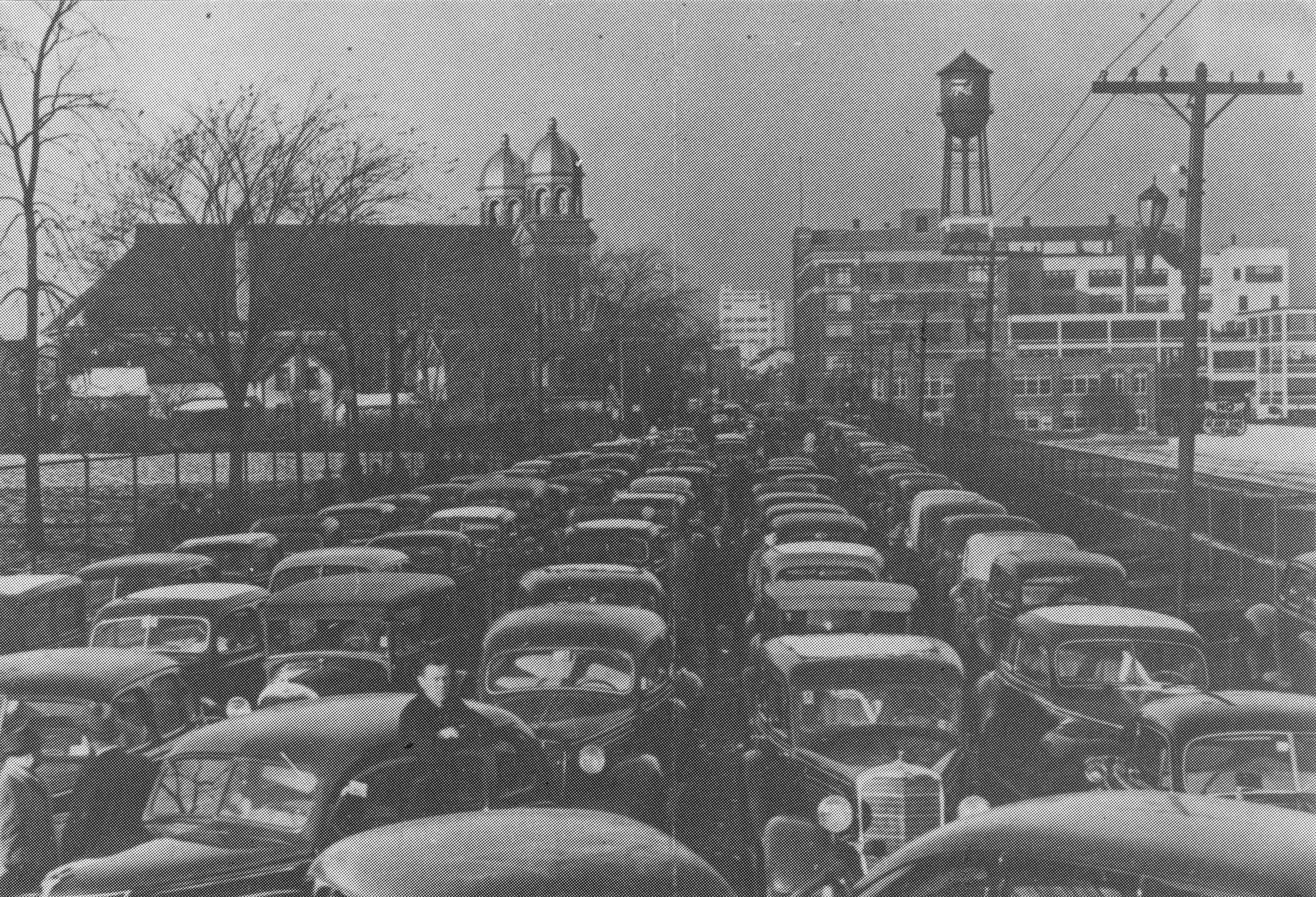
- Workers blockade Sandwich Street, November 6, 1945
- Date: 12 September 1945 – 9 December 1945
- Location: Windsor, Ontario, Canada
- Caused by: Layoffs, unequal treatment of workers in American and Canadian plants
- Methods: Strike, picket line
- Result: Full recognition of the UAW

Parties
United Auto Workers Local 200; Other unions in support	Ford Motor Company	Ontario Provincial Police; Royal Canadian Mounted Police

Lead figures
Roy England	

Number
8,000+ (including supporters)		250+ police

The 99-day Ford strike of 1945 took place in Windsor, Ontario, Canada, from September 12, 1945, to December 9, 1945. Although several union demands were contentious issues, the two main demands of the UAW Local 200 were "union shop and checkoff," which became a rallying cry for the strikers. Negotiations for a new contract had spanned 18 months and officially ended with the exodus of Ford workers at 10 a.m. on the morning of September 12. The strike included picketing and eventually led to a two-day blockade of vehicles surrounding the Ford plant on November 5.

The strike ended on December 9 as both sides agreed to a temporary agreement proposal, while arbitration regarding the implementation of a fully unionized shop and medical coverage continued under Justice Ivan C. Rand. His report was released on January 29, 1946. The Rand Formula, as it became known, was one result of his report. This gave the UAW formal recognition as the sole negotiators representing all employees of Ford Motor Company. This changed both collective bargaining and labour relations by legitimizing unions.

== Context and outcomes ==
In August 1941 an agreement between the American UAW and Ford Motor Company had given American Ford workers union shop and checkoff. Ford did not extend these same provisions to their Canadian workers, this resulted in "bad faith" between the company and the Canadian UAW. Following the ratification of a company-recognized UAW Canadian union on January 15, 1942, periodic work stoppages took place. In response to company continuance of making decisions as it had prior to the formalizing of the union, walkouts took place in November 1942, April 1943 and April-May 1944, these were all precursors of the Ford Strike of 1945.

Throughout 1945 negotiations for a new company-union agreement were conducted. On January 22, 1945, the Ontario minister of Labour Charles Daley, upon request from the Ontario Labour relations Board, appointed Louis Fine as conciliation officer in an attempt to reach an agreement in the contentious negotiations. On March 28 Fine reported back stating: "...in his opinion an agreement was impossible and the situation was very complicated and difficult." On August 31 Ford notified the union that 800 workers were to be laid off, on September 4 tensions were further exacerbated when an additional 1656 layoffs were projected to occur by September 14. Essentially these layoff announcements ended any hopes for a non-strike agreement to be reached. On the morning of September 12, 1945, at 10 a.m., after 18 months of failed negotiations, UAW workers took part in a wildcat strike leaving their work at the Ford plant in Windsor, Ontario.

At a September 12 meeting at the Market Hall Windsor Mayor Art Reaume declared his support for the striking auto workers stating: "Every member of my city council stands prepared to see that no man or woman is starved in this land of plenty. Heads have been smashed in other places by imported police, but let me pledge to you that it will not happen here."

During the Ford Strike of 1945, a huge barricade of workers' cars and trucks were assembled on November 4, 1945, along Drouillard and Riverside. Some 1500 to 2000 vehicles reinforced the United Autoworkers picket line and prevented a violent assault by a joint force of Ontario Provincial Police (OPP) and Royal Canadian Mounted Police (RCMP) officers. This police intervention resulted when the Windsor Police Commission (WPC) asked Ontario Attorney-General Leslie Blackwell for additional reinforcements, in an effort to aid in "maintaining law and order."

Mayor Reaume, based on his support for the striking workers had opposed this action. Nonetheless, Blackwell approved the mobilization of 125 OPP officers into Windsor. In addition approximately another 125 RCMP officers were sent by the Government of Canada. The mobilization of some 250 OPP and RCMP officers authorized by Blackwell and Progressive Conservative Premier George Drew went against assurances they had made to Reaume, as David Moulton writes: "that no police would be sent to Windsor." In addition the federal government was preparing armoured tank units in CFB Borden to break up the barricade. On November 5, Windsor City Council issued an ultimatum "calling for the Ford strikers to remove the motor-car barricade outside the Ford plant or troops may be called in to remove the vehicles." Reaume consistently bucked decisions involving the use of police or force against the picket lines and others.

United Auto Workers Local 200 President Roy England declared the WPC's recruitment and mobilization of the OPP and RCMP personnel was an "attempt at strikebreaking". In response Chrysler Local 195 voted to walk out in sympathy with the UAW Local 200 strike. The sympathy strike began 5 November 1945; this led to a mass exodus of workers from twenty-five different plants, as a result another eight thousand workers flocked to the picket lines in support. Cross-Canada solidarity for the striking autoworkers was seen in places such as Sarnia, Brantford, St. Catharines, Oshawa, Fort William, Ottawa, Kitchener, Hamilton, and even as far away as Nova Scotia. This support varied in nature, from rallies, to other UAW locals stopping work, to American locals sending financial aid.
