= Rand formula =

Principle of Canadian labor law

In Canadian labour law, the Rand formula (also referred to as automatic check-off and compulsory checkoff) is a workplace compromise arising from jurisprudence struck between organized labour (trade unions) and employers that guarantees employers industrial stability by requiring all workers affected by a collective agreement to pay dues to the union by mandatory deduction in exchange for the union agreement to "work now, grieve later."

Historically, in some workplaces, some workers refused to pay dues to the union even after benefiting from wage and benefit improvements negotiated by the union representatives, resulting in friction and violence as they were seen as "freeloaders"; at the same time, absence of a peaceful grievance settlement mechanism created industrial instability as union members often walked off the job. The Rand formula compromise was designed to ensure that no employee will opt out of the union simply to avoid dues yet reap the benefits of collective bargaining, such as higher wages or health insurance.

Supreme Court of Canada Justice Ivan Rand, the eponym of this law, introduced this formula in 1946 as an arbitration decision ending the Ford Strike of 1945 in Windsor, Ontario. The Canada Labour Code and the labour relations laws of a majority of provinces contain provisions requiring the Rand formula when certain conditions are met. In those provinces where the labour relations laws do not make the Rand formula mandatory, the automatic check-off of union dues may become part of the collective bargaining agreement if both parties (i.e., the employer and the trade union) agree. If there are religious objections to paying dues the dues may be donated to a mutually agreed upon charity.

== Compulsory check-off ==
Union dues to be deducted

70. (1) Where a trade union that is the bargaining agent for employees in a bargaining unit so requests, there shall be included in the collective agreement between the trade union and the employer of the employees a provision requiring the employer to deduct from the wages of each employee in the unit affected by the collective agreement, whether or not the employee is a member of the union, the amount of the regular union dues and to remit the amount to the trade union forthwith.

Religious objections

(2) Where the Board is satisfied that an employee, because of their religious conviction or beliefs, objects to joining a trade union or to paying regular union dues to a trade union, the Board may order that the provision in a collective agreement requiring, as a condition of employment, membership in a trade union or requiring the payment of regular union dues to a trade union does not apply to that employee so long as an amount equal to the amount of the regular union dues is paid by the employee, either directly or by way of deduction from their wages, to a registered charity mutually agreed on by the employee and the trade union.

Designation by Board

(3) Where an employee and the trade union are unable to agree on a registered charity for the purposes of subsection (2), the Board may designate any such charity as the charity to which payment should be made.

== Freedom of association issue ==
The Rand formula applies to all employees whether they are union members or not in those workplaces where the majority of the employees vote to form a union. The Supreme Court of Canada has found that the freedom of association is not undermined by the Rand formula. In the 1991 Lavigne decision, the Justices of the Court held in various concurring reasons that if the Rand formula did violate section 2(d), it could be justified under section 1 of the Canadian Charter of Rights and Freedoms as it fundamentally does no more than what is commonplace in a democratic society – the will of the majority prevails, as in the decisions of parliament, and those in the minority are bound by the decision of the majority.

I would suggest that a worker like Lavigne would have no chance of succeeding if his objection to his association with the Union was the extent that it addresses itself to the matters, the terms and conditions of employment for members of his bargaining unit, with respect to which he is "naturally" associated with his fellow employees. Few would think he should not be required to pay for the services the Union renders him in this context. Significantly, he does not object to these matters. With respect to these, the Union is simply viewed as a reasonable vehicle by which the necessary interconnections of Lavigne and his fellow workers is expressed.
When, however, the Union purports to express itself in respect to matters reflecting aspects of Lavigne's identity and membership in the community that go beyond his bargaining unit and its immediate concerns, his claim to the protection of the Charter cannot as easily be dismissed. In regard to these broader matters, his claim is not to absolute isolation but to be free to make his own choices, unfettered by the opinion of those he works with, as to what associations, if any, he will be associated with outside the workplace.

== Reception ==
The Rand Formula has been implemented in a variety of legal contexts and although interpreted by its critics as binding businesses to violate the free choice of their employees, and as having a negative effect in that it limits individual choice on whether or not to pay union dues in a manner incompatible with market economies it has been generally well received. The positive reception of the Rand formula came mostly from unions and their allies with conservative Canadians voicing the most opposition. The rationale for the Rand formula being stated as “unions are service providers entitled to appropriate compensation for the services they provide” demonstrating that the Rand formula was viewed by the judiciary as a reasonable limit on personal economic freedom in a free market economy such as Canada's. The Formula was largely perceived by businesses and individuals in Canada as a compromise between the extremes of mandatory union membership and universal non-unionism.

== Related cases ==
- R v Advance Cutting & Coring Ltd (2001): The Supreme Court upheld mandatory union membership in the Quebec construction industry. R. v. Advance Cutting & Coring Ltd., 2001 SCC 70, (2001) 3 S.C.R. 209
- B.C. Health Services (2007): The Supreme Court recognized collective bargaining as a constitutional right under the freedom of association guarantees. Health Services and Support – Facilities Subsector Bargaining Assn. v. British Columbia, (2007) 2 S.C.R. 391, 2007 SCC 27
- Lavigne (1991): The Supreme Court upheld mandatory dues. Lavigne v. Ontario Public Service Employees Union, (1991) 2 S.C.R. 211
