= Political Blind Date =

Canadian television program

- Country of origin: Canada
- Original language: English
- No. of seasons: 5
- No. of episodes: 29

Production
- Production company: Open Door; Nomad Films

Original release
- Network: TVO
- Release: November 7, 2017 – April 19, 2022

Political Blind Date is a Canadian television program which aired on TVO from 2017 to 2022. The series pairs two Canadian politicians with different ideological beliefs in a "blind date" situation to discuss their perspectives on a political issue; participants are not informed of who they're being paired with until they arrive to begin taping. The participants may already be professionally acquainted with their "date," sometimes even serving in the same political body, but typically do not already know each other very well outside of work, and thus may not previously have had an opportunity to discuss their political perspectives with each other in a non-partisan and non-adversarial way.

The show's fifth and final season was broadcast in 2022. The format has been optioned to various production companies worldwide.

== Production ==
Each episode begins with the two politicians meeting in a neutral space, such as a coffee shop, to begin a basic discussion of their views on the issue, following which each takes the other to tour a facility, business or organization that helps to illuminate their position. For instance, in a Season 1 episode on public transit that paired Doug Ford with Jagmeet Singh, Singh took Ford bicycling to demonstrate how dangerous the activity can be on streets without dedicated bike lanes, while Ford took Singh to Toronto's St. Clair West neighbourhood to illustrate the damage done to the community by the 512 St. Clair streetcar project.

According to the show's producers, the goal is not necessarily to get either politician to change their minds on the issue, so much as to simply allow the participants to understand each other from a more human and less partisan perspective. Several episodes of the series have resulted in the participants continuing to maintain social friendships outside of work; Toronto City Councillors Gary Crawford and Shelley Carroll noted that their Season 3 episode resulted in them learning things about each other's lives, including the commonality that they are both parents to a child with a disability, that they never previously knew even after having served together on council for a full decade.

An episode in the fourth season, airing in 2021, featured the program's first non-Canadian politician, with an episode on clean water featuring former Flint, Michigan mayor Karen Weaver as one of the participants.

The series is produced by Open Door and Nomad Films, and was partially inspired by a similar print feature which ran in The Guardian during the 2017 United Kingdom general election. It also incorporates the participation of the Toronto Star, which publishes background videos on the political issue under discussion before each episode, and followup interviews with the participants about their experience.

The series received a Canadian Screen Award nomination for Best Factual Program or Series at the 7th Canadian Screen Awards in 2019. At the 8th Canadian Screen Awards in 2020, Mark Johnston received a nomination for Best Writing in a Factual Program or Series for the Season 2 episode on indigenous peoples in Canada.

== Episodes ==
=== Season One (2017) ===
No.	Title	Original release date
1	"Marijuana: Garnett Genuis and Nathaniel Erskine-Smith"	November 7, 2017
2	"Transit: Doug Ford and Jagmeet Singh"	November 14, 2017
3	"Safe Injection Sites: Matt Brown and Giorgio Mammoliti"	November 21, 2017
4	"Corrections: Cheri DiNovo and Marie-France Lalonde"	November 28, 2017
5	"Housing: Maria Augimeri and Adam Vaughan"	December 5, 2017
6	"Carbon Taxes: Arthur Potts and Shannon Stubbs"	December 12, 2017

=== Season Two (2019) ===
No.	Title	Original release date
7	"Guns in Canada: Marco Mendicino and Glen Motz"	February 14, 2019
8	"The Urban-Rural Divide: Bonnie Crombie and Andrew Scheer"	February 21, 2019
9	"Taxes: Lisa Raitt and Wayne Easter"	February 28, 2019
10	"Improving Indigenous Communities: Romeo Saganash and Don Rusnak"	March 7, 2019
11	"Opportunities for Newcomers: Jenny Kwan and Gary Anandasangaree"	March 14, 2019
12	"Asylum Seekers: Pierre Paul-Hus and Rob Oliphant"	March 21, 2019

=== Season Three (2020) ===
No.	Title	Original release date
13	"City Finances: Gary Crawford and Shelley Carroll"	January 21, 2020
14	"Subways: Jim Karygiannis and Anthony Perruzza"	January 28, 2020
15	"The Housing Crisis: Ana Bailão and Stephen Holyday"	February 4, 2020
16	"The Food We Eat: Randy Pettapiece and Mike Schreiner"	February 11, 2020
17	"The High-Tech Future: Donna Skelly and Kathryn McGarry"	February 18, 2020
18	"Hydro Rates and Energy Policy: Bill Walker and Peter Tabuns"	February 25, 2020

=== Season Four (2021) ===
No.	Title	Original release date
19	"Hallway Medicine: Sara Singh and Natalia Kusendova"	January 19, 2021
20	"Pipeline Politics: Elizabeth May and Cathy McLeod"	January 26, 2021
21	"Clean Water: Karen Weaver and Mitch Twolan"	February 2, 2021
Mitch Twolan was the mayor of Huron-Kinloss at the time of filming.
22	"Migrant Labour: Taras Natyshak and Dave Epp"	February 9, 2021
23	"Religious Symbols: Michael Coteau and Christopher Skeete"	February 16, 2021
24	"Cities and the Environment: Andrea Khanjin and Jennifer McKelvie"	February 23, 2021

=== Season Five (2022) ===
One fifth-season episode, featuring Monte McNaughton and Jerry Dias discussing trade unionism, was produced and scheduled, but was pulled from broadcast following the breach of trust allegations that were raised against Dias in March.

The season and the series also closed with a new "date" between the same two politicians, Nathaniel Erskine-Smith and Garnett Genuis, who had appeared together in the show's very first episode.

No.	Title	Original release date
25	"Systemic Racism: Greg Fergus and Michael Thompson"	March 15, 2022
26	"Veterans: John Brassard and Darrell Samson"	March 22, 2022
27	"The Real History of Canada: Sol Mamakwa and Jeff McLaren"	March 29, 2022
28	"Homelessness: Patrick Brown and Dan Carter"	April 12, 2022
29	"The Opioid Crisis: Nathaniel Erskine-Smith and Garnett Genuis"	April 19, 2022
