= Lana Payne =

Canadian trade union leader

Lana Payne is a Canadian trade union leader. Originally from Newfoundland and Labrador, she has been the president of Unifor since August 2022. She is also the first woman to be Unifor's president. At the time of her election, Unifor was the largest private sector union in the country. It was also unaffiliated with the Canadian Labour Congress. Prior to being elected president, Payne was secretary-general. In that role, she initiated an independent external investigation into former Unifor president Jerry Dias. She was re-elected in 2025. Payne was a longtime columnist with The Telegram in Newfoundland.
