= Special legislation =

In the United States, special legislation is legislation that targets an individual or a small, identifiable group for treatment that does not apply to all the members of a given class. The expression "special legislation" is legal term of art. A statute is often called special legislation when it targets a named person, but the term can also be applied to legislation that singles out an association or corporation. Although a prototypical special law applies only to a single particular person or entity, legislation is often considered special when it applies to a small group of people or other entities.

Special legislation can be used to place burdens on or grant benefits to identifiable individuals. During the Confederation Period, bills of attainder, the most well-known type of special legislation, were enacted by state legislatures to punish individuals suspected, but neither charged nor convicted, of a crime. Special legislation was also used during that period to grant benefits to identifiable individuals, including monopoly rights and exemptions from generally applicable laws.

Legislatures still enact special laws that grant special burdens or provide special benefits to individuals; however, the most well-known type of special law, the bill of attainder, has largely disappeared. One recent group of state special laws grants special privileges to Tesla by permitting them to sell electric cars directly to consumers under circumstances that are prohibited to other consumers. Other modern special laws apply to a particular city or county. These laws are often called local laws.

Special laws are often criticized because they reflect the corruption of the legislative process, a lack of deliberation on the part of legislatures and because they lead to unjustifiably unequal treatment and allow the legislative branch to encroach on the powers of the executive and judicial branches. However, they are sometimes defended on the ground that they can address problems created by generally applicable laws or cure local problems that call for a local solution.

Most states have constitutional restrictions on some types of special laws. Most state constitutions prohibit special legislation related to certain enumerated subject matters, including prohibiting special laws granting divorces, changing names, and altering court rules. Most other state constitutions provide that the legislature may not pass special laws when a general law can be made applicable. A few states allow special legislation, but only of the legislature follows certain special procedures, like providing notice and a chance to object.

Under the United States Constitution, the modern Supreme Court has not recognized a constitutional prohibition on special legislation. Nevertheless, some scholars have argued that the text and historical background of the Constitution suggests that the Constitution should prohibit some types of special laws.

Special legislation is closely related to what in the United Kingdom are called special or private acts.

In Canada, the federal or provincial governments have the ability to introduce "back-to-work legislation", which is a special law that blocks the strike action or lockout from happening or continuing. It can also impose binding arbitration or a new contract on the disputing parties. Such legislation was enacted during the 2011 Canada Post strike and the 2012 CP Rail strike, thus effectively ending these strikes as legal actions. On the provincial level, similar acts can be passed for other purposes; the National Assembly of Quebec enacted Act 78 in 2012 in order to quell a series of student protests.

== See also ==
- Home rule
- Bill of attainder
