= Buzz Hargrove =

Canadian trade unionist (1944–2025)

Buzz Hargrove OC

2nd President of the Canadian Auto Workers
- In office 1992–2008
- Preceded by: Bob White
- Succeeded by: Ken Lewenza

Personal details
- Born: Basil Eldon Hargrove; March 8, 1944 Bath, New Brunswick, Canada
- Died: June 15, 2025 (aged 81)
- Party: New Democratic Party (until 2006)

Basil Eldon "Buzz" Hargrove OC (March 8, 1944 – June 15, 2025) was a Canadian trade union leader and onetime national president of the Canadian Auto Workers. Until his death in 2025, he served as a distinguished visiting professor at Toronto Metropolitan University's Ted Rogers School of Management and director of its Centre for Labour Management Relations.

Born in Bath, New Brunswick, Hargrove first became involved in the automotive sector as a line worker for the Chrysler assembly plant in Windsor, Ontario. He succeeded Bob White as president of the CAW in 1992. On July 8, 2008, he announced his intention to retire, before he turned 65, in September 2008. The CAW national executive board and staff endorsed then CAW Local 444 president Ken Lewenza to replace Hargrove as national president, and on September 6, 2008, Lewenza was formally elected to the position at a special union convention.

In 1998, Brock University honoured him with a doctorate of laws degree. He received honorary doctorates from the University of Windsor in 2003, from Wilfrid Laurier University in 2004, from the University of New Brunswick in 2008, and from Queen's University in 2009. In 2008, he was made an officer of the Order of Canada.

Hargrove was seen as a proponent of social unionism, and his supporters claimed that he steered the CAW to become a more activist union. In the field of electoral politics, however, the CAW has broken from its longtime support for the left-wing New Democratic Party and instead began increasingly supporting the Liberal Party of Canada.

Hargrove was married to Denise Small, a mediation officer for the Ontario Labour Relations Board

== 1999 Ontario election ==
Hargrove was the leading advocate of tactical voting in the 1999 Ontario provincial election. Hargrove proposed this approach in an attempt to defeat the Progressive Conservative government of Mike Harris. Hargrove's support for this approach, and his union's subsequent commitment of resources in its pursuit, marked the CAW's first major departure from its previous policy of unconditional support of the Ontario New Democratic Party, although the CAW had been somewhat estranged from the Ontario NDP ever since the union had opposed the "Social Contract" austerity measures imposed by the previous 1990–1995 Bob Rae NDP government. The 1999 election, however, was the first time that the union did not at least formally endorse the NDP, instead urging its members (and all voters) to vote for the candidate, NDP or Liberal, that had the best chance of defeating the Progressive Conservative candidate.

Tactical voting not only failed to prevent the re-election of the Tories to another majority government but also was blamed by New Democrats for the party's poor electoral performance, returning only 9 members of provincial parliament, down from 17 in the 1995 election.

Following the 1999 Ontario election, an attempt to expel Hargrove from the Ontario NDP was defeated but Hargrove's relationship with provincial leader Howard Hampton remained acrimonious.

== Pre–2006 federal politics ==
Hargrove was also a long-time critic of federal NDP leader Alexa McDonough, calling for her resignation on several occasions. He criticized McDonough for her effort at modernizing federal NDP policy, which involved moving towards the political centre and adopting "Third Way" policies. Hargrove stated repeatedly that the NDP should move to the left instead.

In 2002, he planned to run for the NDP leadership, but found a "notable lack of enthusiasm" for his potential candidacy. He instead endorsed CAW lawyer Joe Comartin who placed fourth.

Hargrove was initially much more publicly supportive of McDonough's successor, Jack Layton, and the CAW unequivocally supported the federal NDP in the 2004 federal election. The NDP made significant gains in popular vote but gained only 5 seats for a total of 19, well short of its aspirations of 40 or more.

Hargrove reportedly played a role in bringing prime minister Paul Martin and Jack Layton together to negotiate a budget agreement to keep the federal Liberal government in power in exchange for including NDP proposals in the 2005 federal budget.

However, Hargrove sharply criticized Layton when he joined with Conservative leader Stephen Harper and Bloc Québécois leader Gilles Duceppe to bring down the Liberal government with a vote of non-confidence in November 2005. He also echoed his earlier criticism of McDonough by suggesting that Layton, too, was not sufficiently moving the party to the left. The eventual bringing down of the Liberal minority government led to a Conservative minority in the subsequent election.

== 2006 federal election ==
=== Tactical voting ===
For the 2006 Canadian federal election, Hargrove resumed his previous endorsement of tactical voting and urged CAW members (and all voters) to vote for the candidate, NDP or Liberal who had the best chance of defeating the Conservative candidate. During the final days of the 2006 campaign, Hargrove urged all progressive voters in Canada to vote Liberal, which he claimed was the only party that could prevent the Conservative Party of Canada from winning the election. He publicly stated that "ideology does not matter" when the reporter asked about his position.

Despite the qualification of his stated support for NDP incumbents and candidates in 40 "winnable" ridings, Hargrove's speech was widely reported by the media as an endorsement of the Liberals. Hargrove also stated that he did not like the campaign that Jack Layton was running, criticizing Layton by saying that he's "going after the Liberals more so than the Tories, as if somehow undermining the Liberals is going to strengthen the NDP." He was reported as saying that voters should support incumbent NDP MPs and NDP candidates in ridings "where they can defeat the Conservatives."

=== Break with NDP ===
Hargrove's strategy caused some controversy among long-time NDP activists and union members who saw him as reneging on core labour and left-wing values. In response, they carried anti-Hargrove placards at rallies and distributed buttons with the slogan: "Buzz Off. I'm voting NDP."

Traditional NDP supporters were also opposed to aligning their movement with the Liberals, who were embroiled in the sponsorship and income trust scandals.

Despite being one of Hargrove's 40 endorsed NDP candidates, Sid Ryan, president of the Ontario chapter of the Canadian Union of Public Employees and the candidate for Oshawa, blamed his loss on tactical voting. Ryan claimed Hargrove's statement confused potential NDP supporters in his riding and caused some of them to vote Liberal in Oshawa even though the Liberal candidate was not a viable contender.

Some pointed out that Hargrove's call for strategic voting has also caused financial harm to the NDP under Canada's system of public financing for federal elections, which pays a subsidy to each federal party based on their popular vote.

=== Controversy ===
On January 18, 2006, Hargrove made a widely criticized speech at a Liberal rally in Ontario where he urged voters in Quebec to vote for the Bloc Québécois in preference to the Conservatives, calling Conservative leader Stephen Harper's view of Canada "a separatist view" and recommending "anything to stop the Tories". The statements forced Liberal leader Paul Martin to defend Harper later in the day by saying "I have profound differences with Mr. Harper, but I have never questioned his patriotism".

Hargrove also attacked the principles of Albertans, and Stephen Harper in particular (though Harper was actually born and raised in Toronto, Ontario, moving to Alberta only in his early twenties), saying "His sense, is about Alberta, where the wealth in Alberta, everyone recognizes, is much greater than it is anywhere in Canada. The principles that (Harper was) brought up with, and believes in coming out of there, don't sit well with the rest of Canada."

=== Results ===
Near the end of the 2006 campaign, sensing the momentum that would result in a Conservative victory, NDP leader Jack Layton defied Paul Martin's and Hargrove's pleas for progressive voters to vote strategically under the Liberal banner. Layton intensified his attacks on the Liberal scandals, while also pledging to use the NDP's clout in a minority government to "keep the Conservatives in check".

The NDP increased their caucus to 29 seats, a significant gain over the 2004 election. Hargrove afterwards argued that strategic voting had prevented the Conservatives from forming a majority government and suggested that the three main opposition parties could form a coalition to get several key pieces of legislation passed.

=== Suspension from the NDP ===
Following the election, on February 11, 2006, the provincial executive body of the Ontario NDP voted to suspend Hargrove's NDP membership and effectively expel him from the party for supporting the Liberals. This move also automatically suspended his membership in the federal party; the NDP, unlike other major Canadian parties, is integrated at the federal and provincial/territorial levels. Hargrove stated he was "shocked and surprised" by this decision, but he would not apologize for his actions during the 2006 election nor would he commit to not endorsing candidates for other parties in the future.

The CAW retaliated against the NDP for Hargrove's suspension by severing all union ties with the Party, a move formalized at the CAW's 2006 convention.

== 2006 CAW leadership race ==
On December 9, 2005, Hargrove confirmed that he would seek a sixth and final three-year term as CAW President at the union's convention in Vancouver, British Columbia, in August 2006. In February 2008 it was reported that Hargrove might face an opposing candidate for the CAW presidency for the first time. CAW Local 1256 chair and Oakville and district labour council president Willie Lambert was subsequently confirmed as an opposition candidate.

Delegates were scheduled to vote for CAW executive officers on Thursday, August 17. However, on Wednesday, August 16, the union announced that Lambert had withdrawn his candidacy for CAW president, leaving Hargrove unopposed. Hargrove concluded his acceptance speech by proposing to his long-time girlfriend Denise Small. Small accepted. The two were subsequently married at a small, private ceremony in Toronto on December 22, 2007.

== 2007 Ontario election ==
In the 2007 Ontario provincial election the CAW as a union again endorsed strategic voting. Hargrove, however, again went further to slam both the NDP and its leader, Howard Hampton. He told the editorial board of the Toronto Star that the NDP had "lost complete touch" with the people of Ontario and that he saw "absolutely no reason to vote NDP." Hargrove then went on to praise on the Ontario Liberals, claiming the party had been "more left than the NDP over the last four years" and predicting left-leaning voters would vote Liberal in the upcoming election. The Ontario Liberal Party ultimately won a second consecutive majority government.

== Later life and death ==
On February 27, 2009, Hargrove replaced Eric Lindros as the NHLPA ombudsman on an interim basis. He would later resign from the position on November 8, 2009.

Hargrove died on June 15, 2025, at the age of 81.

== Bibliography ==
- Hargrove, Buzz; Skene, Wayne (1998). Labour of love: The fight to create a more humane Canada. Toronto, Ontario, Canada: Macfarlane Walter & Ross. ISBN 9781551990330.
- Hargrove, Buzz (2009). Laying it on the line: Driving a hard bargain in challenging times. Toronto, Ontario, Canada: HarperCollins. ISBN 9781554684458.

Preceded by Bob White	National President of the CAW; 1992–2008	Succeeded by Ken Lewenza
