= Lavigne v Ontario Public Service Employees Union =

- Supreme Court of Canada

Hearing: June 18–19, 1990 Judgment: June 27, 1991
- Citations: [1991] 2 SCR 211
- Docket No.: 21378

Court membership
- Chief Justice: Antonio Lamer; Puisne Justices: Bertha Wilson, Gérard La Forest, Claire L'Heureux-Dubé, John Sopinka, Charles Gonthier, Peter Cory, Beverley McLachlin, William Stevenson

Reasons given
- Majority: La Forest J., joined by Sopinka and Gonthier JJ.
- Concurrence: McLachlin J.
- Concurrence: Wilson J., joined by L'Heureux-Dubé J.
- Concurrence: Cory J.
- Lamer C.J. and Stevenson J. took no part in the consideration or decision of the case.

Lavigne v Ontario Public Service Employees Union, [1991] 2 S.C.R. 211 is a leading Supreme Court of Canada decision on freedom of expression under section 2(b) of the Canadian Charter of Rights and Freedoms and freedom of association under section 2(d) of the Charter.

Francis Lavigne, an Ontario community college teacher complained that the Ontario Public Service Employees Union was using union dues for purposes to which he disagreed. He claimed this infringed his rights under the freedom of expression section of the Charter. The Supreme Court ruled unanimously against him but the seven judges used different reasons to apply the ruling.

== Background ==
Francis Lavigne had been a teacher at an Ontario community college. Lavigne was not a member of the Ontario Public Services Employees Union (OPSEU) and not required to be. Lavigne did not oppose the Rand formula requirement to pay dues but did oppose the use of some of his dues for activities unrelated to a union's core workplace causes.

The Canadian Civil Liberties Association intervened to support the union position, saying "Lavigne's protection is in his right to join or not to join the organization; and to use or not use the democratic process [of the organization]."

Under the union's constitution they were allowed to use the fees collected towards the advancement of the "common interests, economic, social and political, of the members and of all public employees, wherever possible, by all appropriate means". OPSEU put some of the money towards interests such as disarmament campaigns, the National Union of Mine Workers in the United Kingdom, health care workers' union in Nicaragua, and sponsored events for the New Democratic Party.

The practice was not unusual for similar unions, nonetheless, Lavigne opposed many of the causes supported by OPSEU. He brought an application for declaratory relief against the union on the basis that the Colleges Collective Bargaining Act, which gave the unions power to allocate funds to causes of their choosing, violated his right to freedom of expression and association under section 2(b) and 2(d) of the Charter.

The Supreme Court of Canada considered the following issues:

1. Whether the Charter applied.
2. If so, whether the payments to the OPSEU infringed his freedom of expression guarantee under section 2(b) of the Charter.
3. Whether the payments to the OPSEU infringed his freedom of association under section 2(d) of the Charter.
4. If any violation is found, whether the violation can be saved under section 1 of the Charter.

== Opinion of the Court ==
The Court unanimously held that the Charter did apply. They also decided that there was no violation, but for different reasons.

Justice La Forest, with Sopinka and Gonthier, held that there was a violation of freedom of association (section 2(d) of the Charter) but that it was justified under section 1. He also held that the use of the union funds did not constitute forced expression, and so there was no violation of the freedom of expression.

Justice Wilson, with L’Heureux-Dube, held that there was no violation at all, and if there was it would be saved under section 1. She disagreed with La Forest by finding that the use of the union funds did have expressive content, but the payments did not imply that Lavigne supported any of the union's causes and did not prevent him from expressing his own personal views. Accordingly, there was no violation of the freedom of expression.

Justice Cory and Justice McLachlin, writing separate decisions, each held there was no violation.

== See also ==
- List of Supreme Court of Canada cases (Lamer Court)
