= Employment Standards Act (British Columbia) =

Canadian provincial law

The Employment Standards Act of British Columbia (Canada), is legislation enacted by the provincial government of British Columbia to protect the rights of working people. Sections within the act outline the employers responsibility to their employees, notably things such as minimum wage, meal breaks, and parental leave. The act also works to protect residents of the province by preventing employment discrimination.

== Part I: Introduction ==
This Act applies to all employees, with the exception of those expressly excluded by regulation. The standards set out in the Act are considered minimum requirements, and agreements to waive such requirements are considered of no force and effect, unless the agreement in question is referred to in s. 3(2) or (4).

=== Objectives ===
The purposes of this Act are as follows:

- (a) to ensure that employees in British Columbia receive at least basic standards of compensation and conditions of employment;
- (b) to promote the fair treatment of employees and employers;
- (c) to encourage open communication between employers and employees;
- (d) to provide fair and efficient procedures for resolving disputes over the application and interpretation of this Act;
- (e) to foster the development of a productive and efficient labour force that can contribute fully to the prosperity of British Columbia;
- (f) to contribute in assisting employees to meet work and family responsibilities.

=== Scope of the Act ===
The Act applies to all employees other than those excluded by regulation.

"Employee" includes:

- A person, including a deceased person, receiving or entitled to wages for work performed for another,
- A person an employer allows, directly or indirectly, to perform work normally performed by an employee,
- A person being trained by an employer for the employer's business
- A person on leave from an employer, and
- A person who has a right of recall

=== Exceptions ===
Federally regulated employers (for example, banks, broadcasting, rail transportation, and postal contractors) are governed by the Canada Labour Code.

There are also some specific exemptions:

- Professionals, such as accountants, engineers, dentists, lawyers
- Students engaged in work study programs

In addition, if a collective agreement deals with:

- Hours of work or overtime
- Statutory holidays
- Annual vacation or vacation pay
- Seniority retention, recall, termination of employment or layoff

then corresponding provisions of the Act do not apply. If the collective agreement does not deal with these topics, this Act does apply.

Managers are exempt from the hours of work, overtime and statutory holiday provisions. "Manager" is defined as:

- A person whose principal employment responsibilities consist of supervising and/or directing human or other resources
- A person employed in an executive capacity

Independent contractors are not considered employees. In order to classify an individual as one or the other, there are four common law tests that can be applied:

- Control test
- Four-fold test
- Organization or integration test
- Permanency test
- Specific result test
- Economic reality test

The requirements set out in this Act generally cannot be waived since they are minimum requirements.

== Part II: Hiring Employees ==
The provisions in this section deal with topics such as the hiring of children, the licensing of employment and talent agencies and farm labour contractors, and requirements for those working as domestics and working in residences.

== Part III: Wages, Special Clothing and Records ==
The general minimum increased from $17.40 per hour to $17.85 per hour on June 1, 2025. There are also special minimum wages in the Regulations for certain types of employees, such as home support workers and farm workers.

Wages can be paid by cash, cheque, draft or money order. Direct deposit can be used only if expressly authorized. Wages should be paid semi-monthly, with no more than 16 days between pay days, and no more than 8 days after the pay period.

An employer cannot directly or indirectly withhold wages, and cannot require employees to contribute towards the costs of business (except under the Regulation).

A wage statement must be provided to the employee on each pay day unless it would be the same as the statement given in the last pay period.

== Part IV: Hours of Work and Overtime ==
Employees are to receive a 30-minute meal break at least once every 5 hours. This break is to be unpaid, unless the employee is required to work or to be available for work during the break.

With regard to minimum daily hours:

- For employees not scheduled to work, or scheduled for less than 8 hours, they are entitled to a minimum 2 hours of pay, whether or not work is performed.
- For employees scheduled to work more than 8 hours, they are entitled to a minimum of 4 hours of pay, whether or not work is performed.
- If work is suspended for reasons beyond the employer's control, the employee is entitled to the greater of 2 hours or the actual time worked.
- There are some exceptions: (i) if the employee is unfit to work, or (ii) if the employee fails to comply with the Workers Compensation Act.

With regard to the maximum hours of work before overtime applies:

- Overtime rates apply where the employer requires or allows the employee to work more than 8 hours a day or 40 hours per week.

An employer must allow an employee at least 32 consecutive hours free from work each week or pay 1.5 times the regular wage rate for the time worked during that 32-hour period. An employee is also entitled to have 8 hours off between shifts unless required to work because of an emergency.

== Part V: Statutory Holidays ==
The following are statutory holidays in British Columbia:

- New Year's Day, Good Friday, Victoria Day, Canada Day, BC Day, Labour Day, Thanksgiving Day, Remembrance Day, Christmas Day.

An employee is entitled to statutory holiday pay if they have been employed for at least 30 consecutive days and has worked or earned wages for at least 15 of 30 calendar days before the holiday.

== Part VI: Leaves and Jury Duty ==
Pregnancy Leave: Unpaid leave for employees giving birth to a child

The length of the leave depends on when the request is made, and whether there are any complications with the pregnancy.

- If leave is requested while the employee is pregnant, they are entitled to up to 17 consecutive weeks of unpaid leave. This leave cannot begin more than 11 weeks before the expected birth date and not later than the actual birth date. It cannot end earlier than 6 weeks after the actual birth date (unless less than 17 weeks is being taken) or later than 17 weeks after the actual birth.
- If leave is requested after birth or termination of the pregnancy, the employee is entitled to 6 consecutive weeks of unpaid leave beginning on the date of the birth or the termination of the pregnancy.
- An extension can be requested for up to an additional 6 weeks if the employee is unable to return to work for reasons related to the birth or termination of the pregnancy.

Parental Leave: Unpaid leave for natural or adoptive parents of a child

The length and timing of the leave depends on the relationship of the employee to the child.

For birth parents:

- If the birth mother has taken pregnancy leave, she is entitled to 35 consecutive weeks of unpaid leave
- If the birth mother did not take pregnancy leave, she is entitled to 37 weeks of unpaid leave
- Leave must begin after the child's birth and no later than 52 weeks after the actual birth date
- Birth fathers are entitled to up to 37 consecutive weeks of unpaid leave

For adoptive parents:

- Are entitled to up to 37 consecutive weeks of unpaid leave. This leave must begin within 52 weeks after the child is placed with the parent
- Marital status does not matter - so it includes same sex and common law partners
- An extension can be requested. Leave can be extended by 5 additional weeks in the event a child has a physical, psychological, or emotional condition requiring an additional period of parental care
- Additional time has to begin immediately after the previous leave

There is a maximum of 52 weeks of unpaid leave.

In addition, there are a few other types of leave that are outlined in the Act, including family responsibility leave, compassionate care leave, reservists' leave, and bereavement leave.

== Part VII: Annual Vacation ==
Employees are entitled to annual vacation. If an employee has been with the same employer for 12 consecutive months, they are entitled to 2 weeks per year. If the employee has been with the employer for 5 consecutive years, they are entitled to 3 weeks per year.

== Part VIII: Termination of Employment ==
The amount of notice or pay in lieu of notice than an employee is entitled to depends on their length of service with their employer.

- For service less than 3 months, no severance pay is required
- For service between 3 and 12 months, 1 week of severance is required
- For service between 12 months and 3 years, 2 weeks of severance are required
- For service of 3 years or more, the amount of severance is calculated on the basis of 1 week per year of service, to a maximum of 8 weeks.

Additional notice is required where a large number of employees are terminated at a single location within a 2-month period.

Exceptions:

- Defined term employment
- Employment was for specific work to be completed within 12 months
- Employment has become impossible to perform due to unforeseeable event
- Employee employed by a construction employer at one or more construction sites
- Terminated employee refused reasonable alternative employment with employer

There are other sections of the Act that deal with Termination of Employment Variances; Complaints, Investigations and Determinations; Enforcement; Employment Standards Tribunal; Appeals; General Provisions; Transitional and Consequential Provisions.
