= Unifor Local 200 =

- Founded: November 23, 1941
- Headquarters: 1855 Turner Rd., Windsor, Ontario, Canada
- Location: Canada
- Members: 1521 (Feb 2009)
- Key people: John D'Agnolo, President
- Parent organization: Unifor
- Website: www.uniforlocal200.org

Former logo as Canadian Auto Workers Local 200

Unifor Local 200 is a local union of the general trade union Unifor. It represents auto industry workers in Windsor, Ontario at three Ford Motor Company of Canada engine plants and one Nemak aluminum casting plant.
