= Nova Scotia Federation of Labour =

Provincial trade union federation in Canada

NSFL
- Nova Scotia Federation of Labour
- Founded: 1956; 70 years ago
- Headquarters: Halifax, Nova Scotia
- Location: Canada
- Members: ~80,000
- Key people: Danny Cavanagh, president
- Affiliations: CLC
- Website: nslabour.ca

The Nova Scotia Federation of Labour (NSFL) is the Nova Scotia provincial trade union federation of the Canadian Labour Congress.

It was founded in 1956, and had a membership of 70,000 members up to May 2017 when that grew to 80,000 members when the Nova Scotia teachers union joined. Its conventions are held every two years.

The majority of the labour unions in the province are affiliated to the NSFL with some exceptions such as the Nova Scotia Union of Public and Private Employees. Also, several building trade unions are not affiliated to the NSFL, instead they are affiliated to the Mainland Building Trades Council.

The NSFL campaigns on a variety of issues including the Right-to-Strike, free and fair collective bargaining, defending and expanding Medicare, the manufacturing crises, creating quality, public early childhood education, supporting Buy Local campaigns and working with other social partners like the Canadian Federation of Students to reduce tuition fees and the Canadian Center Of Policy Alternatives on economic concerns.

The NSFL also supports the Nova Scotia New Democratic Party and many affiliates are nonpartisan.

Its current President is Danny Cavanagh and the Vice President is Jason McLean.

In May 2017 for the first time in the history and under the leadership of President Cavanagh the 11,000 members of the Nova Scotia Teachers Union passed a motion with a 77% majority to join the Federation. In April 2017, the 600 members of CUPE local 3890 also affiliated.

== See also ==
- History of Nova Scotia
