= Savage Alberta Railway =

Overview
- Headquarters: Grande Prairie, Alberta
- Reporting mark: SAR
- Locale: Alberta, Canada
- Dates of operation: 1999–2006

Technical
- Track gauge: 4 ft 8 1/2 in (1,435 mm) standard gauge

Savage Alberta Railway (reporting mark SAR), known as Alberta RailNet (reporting mark ARN) between 1999 and 2005, was a Canadian short line railway that operated in the province of Alberta until late 2006.

== History ==
Alberta RailNet was formed in June 1999 to purchase former Canadian National Railway trackage running north from Swan Landing to Grande Prairie, Hythe, Spirit River and Glavin. The company was owned by North American RailNet.

The Swan Landing to Grande Prairie line was opened in the 1960s as CN's Alberta Resources Railway, whereas the Glavin – Spirit River – Grande Prairie – Hythe line was the former Northern Alberta Railways (ex–Edmonton, Dunvegan and British Columbia Railway), which CN purchased in 1981. In total, the railway operated 345 miles of lines.

In 2005, Savage Industries, through its subsidiary CANAC, purchased Alberta RailNet's assets from North American Railnet, and renamed the railway to the Savage Alberta Railway.

On December 1, 2006, CN announced that it had purchased Savage Alberta Railway for $25 million and that it had begun operating the railway the same day.

The locomotive engineers, conductors and assistant conductors who work on the former Savage Alberta Railway lines (now CN) are represented by the Teamsters Canada Rail Conference (TCRC).
