= Unifor =

Trade union in Canada

- Formation: 2013
- Merger of: Canadian Auto Workers; Communications, Energy and Paperworkers Union of Canada
- Type: Trade union
- Headquarters: Toronto, Ontario, Canada
- Location: Canada
- Members: 310,000
- Official languages: English; French
- President: Lana Payne
- Affiliations: IndustriALL Global Union; International Federation of Journalists; International Transport Workers' Federation
- Website: unifor.org

Unifor is a Canadian general trade union founded in 2013 as a merger of the Canadian Auto Workers (CAW) and Communications, Energy and Paperworkers unions. It consists of 310,000 workers, and associate members in industries including manufacturing, media, aviation, forestry and fishing, making it the largest private sector union in Canada. In January 2018, the union left the Canadian Labour Congress, Canada's national trade union centre, to become independent.

The union elected Jerry Dias, a former union leader at de Havilland's facility in Downsview, as its first president on August 31, 2013. He announced his retirement on March 12, 2022, for health reasons.

== Split from the Canadian Labour Congress ==
On January 16, 2018, the National Executive Board of Unifor decided unanimously to discontinue affiliation with the Canadian Labour Congress (CLC) and become independent. In a notice posted on their website, they stated their reasons for the split were due to CLC and its affiliates lack of action and will in addressing alleged aggressive and undemocratic tactics of US-based unions towards Canadian locals. The CLC accused Unifor of leaving the congress in order to engage in "raiding" (soliciting members of another union) following an announcement that UNITE HERE Local 75 in Toronto would leave UNITE HERE and join Unifor. CAW, one of Unifor's predecessors, had previously been expelled from the CLC in 1998 due to accusations of raiding.

== Local 1285 ==
Unifor Local 1285
- Founded: May 12, 1961
- Headquarters: Brampton, Ontario, Canada
- Location: Ontario, Canada
- Members: 7,242 (Sept. 2008)
- Parent organization: Unifor
- Website: uniforlocal1285.ca
- Formerly called: Canadian Auto Workers Local 1285

Unifor Local 1285 (previously Canadian Auto Workers Local 1285) is a merged local that represents automotive workers in Brampton, Canada. It is the biggest private sector union local in Brampton.

Unifor appeared on the Canadian broadcast of Super Bowl LIII in February 2019 to air an advertisement opposing General Motors' decision to shut the Oshawa Car Assembly factory. Unifor received a letter from General Motors (GM) Canada two days before the game. The letter told Unifor to stop airing the commercial and to discontinue an online advertisement on boycotting Mexican-manufactured GM vehicles, stating that this was an attempt to tarnish GM's reputation along with their own. Despite these requests, the campaign ran as planned, with Unifor intended to continue airing it at subsequent significant events.

== Saskatchewan Crown corporations ==
Most of Saskatchewan's Provincial Crown corporations employ Unifor members.

- Local 1-S represents workers at SaskTel, Directwest, and SecurTek and is based in Regina.
- Local 2-S represents workers at SaskTel and is based in Saskatoon.
- Local 649 represents workers at SaskPower and SaskEnergy.
- Local 820 represents workers at SaskWater and the Water Security Agency.

On September 30, 2019, approximately 5,000 Unifor members from all of the above locals began a work-to-rule campaign after failing to negotiate new contracts with the provincial government. By October 4, the job action had escalated into a strike, as all of those workers walked off the job and began picketing, with the exception of those workers working essential roles such as 911 operators, power outage dispatchers, and natural gas leak responders.

== Amazon ==
In July 2025, the BC Labour Relations Board certified Unifor as the union representing Amazon warehouse workers in Delta, British Columbia. It found that management had "engaged in unfair labour practices that interfered with the unionization process."
