= Fred Dowling =

Canadian trade unionist (1902–1982)

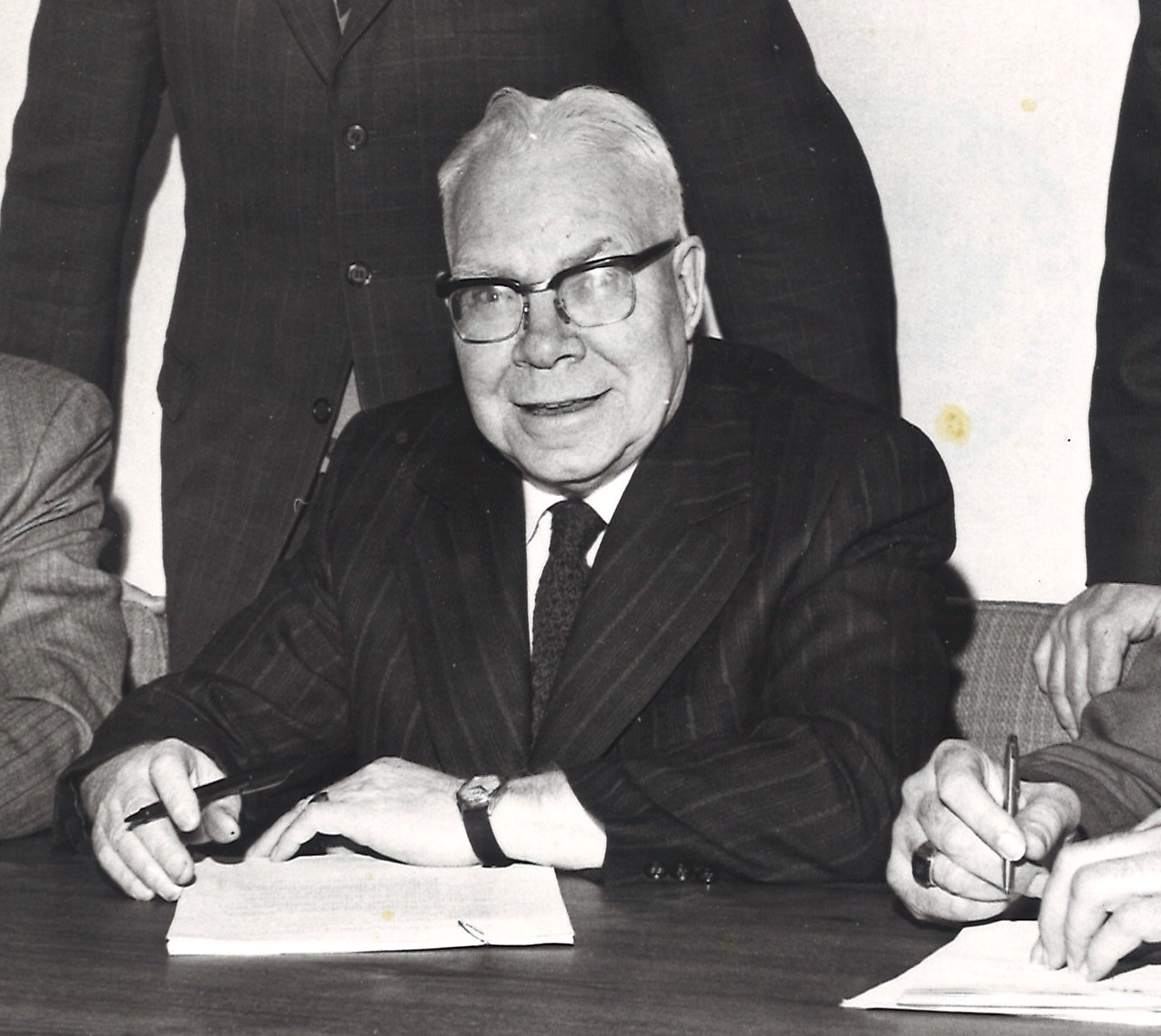

Canadian Director of the Amalgamated Meat Cutters and Butcher Workmen of North America – Canadian Food and Allied Workers
- In office 1968–1972
- Leader: Patrick E. Gorman
- Preceded by: Position established
- Succeeded by: Romeo Mathieu

Canadian Director and International Vice President of the United Packinghouse Workers of America
- In office 1943–1968
- President: Lewis J. Clark; Ralph Helstein
- Preceded by: Position established
- Succeeded by: Position dissolved

Personal details
- Born: 1902 Toronto, Ontario, Canada
- Died: 1982 (aged 79–80) Toronto, Ontario, Canada
- Party: Co-operative Commonwealth Federation; New Democratic Party
- Occupation: Trade unionist

Fred Dowling (1902–1982) was a Canadian trade unionist who is best known for leading the effort to organize meatpacking workers in Canada during the late 1930s and early 1940s. He was a founding leader of the United Packinghouse Workers of America (UPWA), and served the union as international vice-president and Canadian director for nearly 30 years.

== Early life ==
Dowling was born and raised in Toronto where, as a young man, he excelled in semi-pro baseball. After a stint with the Canadian National Railways in 1935, he went to Chicago where, in a job with Armour and Company, he made his first contact with the meat packing industry.

The conditions in the packinghouses were so abysmal that Dowling would say, looking back, he "learned what it's like to work in hell".

Living through the Great Depression, Dowling's conscience was aroused by the experience, and he became active in the Co-operative Commonwealth Federation (CCF), and the CCF Youth Movement in particular. He also served as the labour editor for the CCF newspaper, The New Commonwealth.

== Packinghouse worker organizing ==
Dowling first developed and later refined his organizing abilities through his work as a CCF activist, and his ability to organize working people became especially evident with the coming of the Congress of Industrial Organizations (CIO) to Canada. Dowling helped with the CIO campaign to organize workers at the General Motors plant in Oshawa, Ontario, and also with efforts to assist rubber workers.

In 1939, CIO Canadian Director Charles Millard hired Dowling as a staff representative and assigned him to the Packinghouse Workers Organizing Committee (PWOC).

Under Dowling's leadership, the PWOC succeeded in Canada, and Dowling was present at the 1943 founding convention of the United Packinghouse Workers of America in Chicago, where he was elected to the international executive board and officially became the new union's Canadian director.

== "Mr. Packinghouse" ==
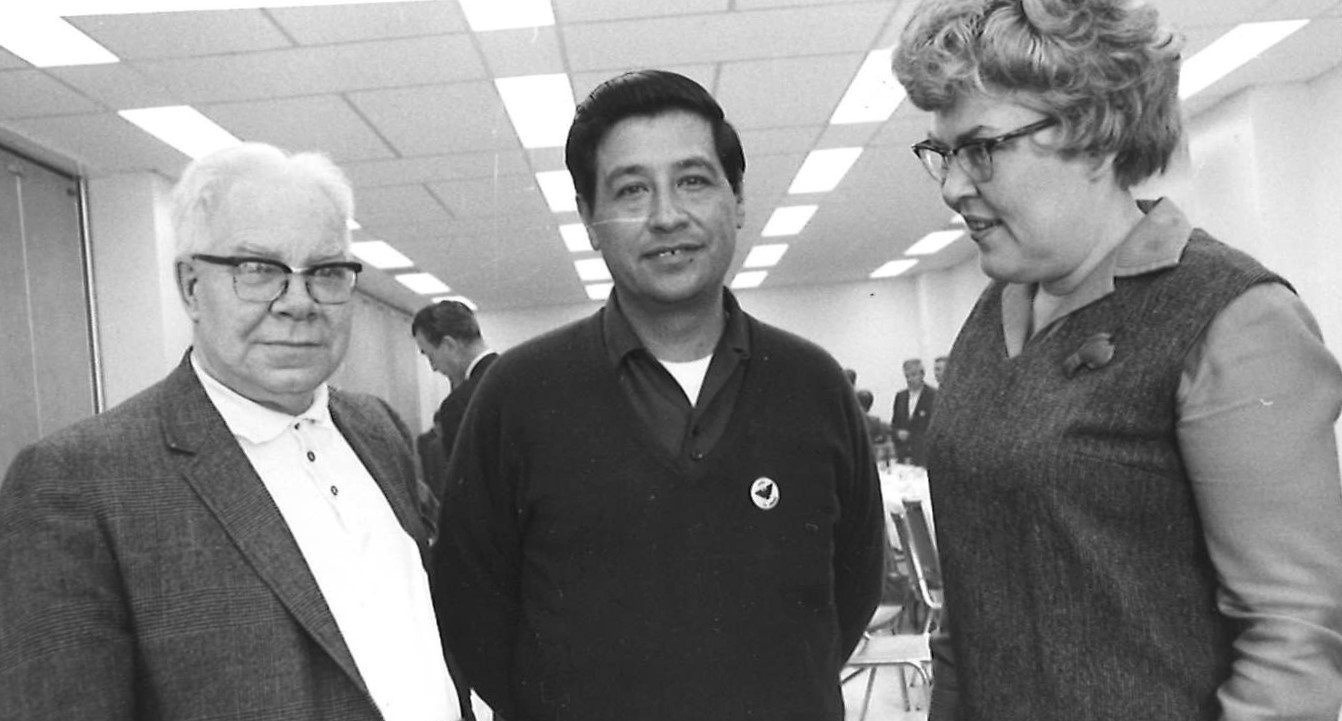
Dowling, left, with Cesar Chavez and UPWA activist Iona Samis

Serving as vice-president and Canadian director of the UPWA for 30 years, Dowling was affectionately known in Canadian labour circles as "Mr. Packinghouse". Under his long leadership the UPWA became the dominant union in the entire Canadian food industry, including flour and cereal branches and the related shoe and leather industry. The Canadian district had almost complete autonomy within the international union.

Dowling led the effort to compel the federal government and the "Big Three" Canadian meatpacking companies – Canada Packers, Swift Canadian and Burns Meats – into a master collective agreement and bargaining system that spanned the country and gave unprecedented negotiating power to the union.

When the federal government turned jurisdiction for labour relations back to the provinces following the Second World War, Dowling, supported by his protege and Quebec lieutenant Romeo Mathieu, engineered a dramatic nationwide packinghouse strike in 1947 that secured the master agreement system and turned the young union into one of the most militant in Canadian labour history. His organizing skills then turned to other sectors of the food processing industry: canning, poultry, dairy and others. In the late 1960s, Dowling launched what would become the massively successful organizing of the Atlantic fishery industry.

== Creation of the New Democratic Party ==
Like many of his packinghouse comrades, Dowling fervently believed the labour movement must encompass wider social and economic causes, concern for peace and world understanding.

Dowling and the UPWA were a driving force for the creation of the New Democratic Party (NDP) in 1961, and Dowling was elected its first-ever labour vice-president.

== Merger with the Amalgamated Meat Cutters ==
In 1968, the UPWA merged with their arch-rivals the Amalgamated Meat Cutters and Butcher Workmen of North America, and, reflective of old wounds between the two unions, the Canadians led by Dowling insisted on their own charter specifying their own unique name, the Canadian Food and Allied Workers.

Dowling retired in 1972, but remained active until his death in 1982.

== Recognition ==
In recognition of his exceptional dedication to organizing Canadian packinghouse workers, and the significance of the UPWA in the history of the United Food and Commercial Workers, the Canadian locals of the UFCW created a post-secondary scholarship in Dowling's name that is awarded annually to the union's members and their children.

Dowling's contributions to the labour and social democracy movement was also recognized by Ontario Premier Bob Rae, who named a Toronto co-operative housing complex in the food worker's honour. The Fred Dowling Co-Op offers a democratic approach to housing that provides a mix of market and subsidized residential units in the Davenport area of Toronto.
