= Romeo Mathieu =

Canadian trade unionist (1917–1989)

Romeo Mathieu CM
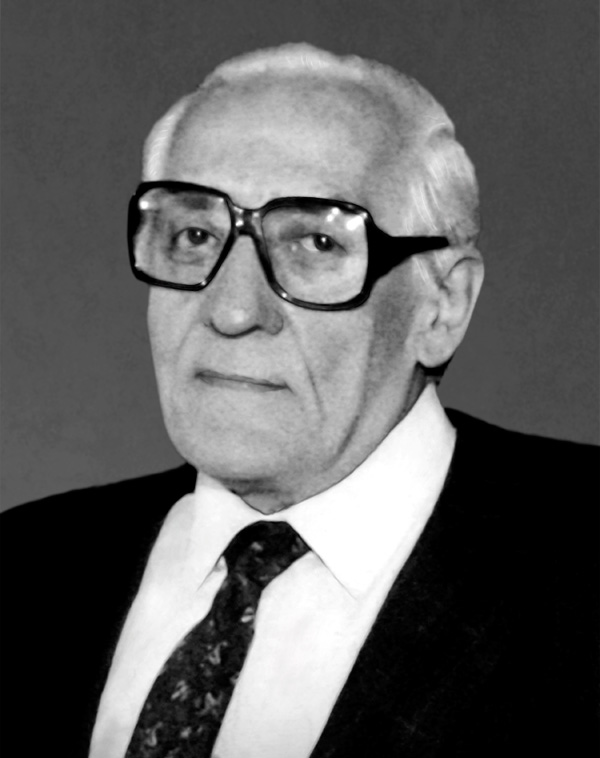

International Vice-President of the United Food and Commercial Workers – Canadian Director of Region 18
- In office 1979–1983
- President: William H. Wynn
- Preceded by: Position established
- Succeeded by: Frank Benn

Canadian Director of the Amalgamated Meat Cutters and Butcher Workmen of North America – Canadian Food and Allied Workers
- In office 1972–1979
- Leader: Patrick E. Gorman
- Preceded by: Fred Dowling
- Succeeded by: Position dissolved

1st Secretary-General of the Fédération des travailleurs et travailleuses du Québec (FTQ)
- In office 1957–1963
- Preceded by: Position established
- Succeeded by: unknown

1st Secretary-General of the Fédération des unions industrielles du Québec (FUIQ)
- In office 1952–1957
- Preceded by: Position established
- Succeeded by: Position dissolved

Personal details
- Born: 1917 Montreal, Quebec, Canada
- Died: April, 1989 Montreal, Quebec, Canada
- Party: Co-operative Commonwealth Federation; New Democratic Party
- Spouse: Huguette Plamondon
- Education: Technical Institute of Montreal
- Occupation: Trade unionist

Romeo Mathieu CM (1917 – April 1989) was a Canadian trade unionist, progressive political activist, and leading solidarity builder for the Quebec labour movement.

Mathieu is best associated with his leading role in expanding the efforts of the United Packinghouse Workers of America (UPWA) into Quebec during the 1940s and '50s, and assisting with the merger between the UPWA and the Amalgamated Meat Cutters and Butcher Workmen of North America in 1968.

He also made a significant contribution to the creation of the United Food and Commercial Workers International Union in 1979. In addition to his outstanding contributions to the labour movement, Mathieu was a standing member of the Quebec intelligentsia during the 1950s and 60s, and served as a formidable presence in advancing many of the province's social movements, including the Quiet Revolution.

== Early life ==
Mathieu was born in Montreal, Quebec, in 1917 and displayed a hunger for politics at an early age. Unlike most other boys in Quebec during this period, Mathieu demonstrated little to no interest in hockey or sports in general. Instead, he became a political animal and strove to be his uncle's protege, who was a professional organizer for the Liberal Party of Canada.

He was educated at the Technical Institute of Montreal, where he learned mechanics and technical drawing, and graduated on the eve of the Great Depression. The experiences of the Great Depression had a profound impact on Mathieu, resulting in a paradigm shift for his worldview, political beliefs and associations. Soon thereafter, he abandoned his childhood affiliation to the Liberal Party and instead embraced the emerging, and more radical, views of the Co-operative Commonwealth Federation (CCF).

== Packinghouse worker organizing ==
One day in 1938, while taking a lunch break from his job in the credit department of a Montreal store, a curious, young Romeo Mathieu dropped into a union meeting and listened to an organizer from the garment workers. From then on his life was with the labour movement. His first project was organizing workers at the Dominion Engineering Works in Longueuil, Quebec for the International Association of Machinists. The organizing drive was successful, and the new local union elected Mathieu as its full-time president.Mathieu soon made a name for himself in Quebec's labour circles, and rapidly gained a reputation for being a highly effective and, indeed, fierce union mobilizer. Before long, he became active in the Trades and Labour Congress of Canada (TLC), eventually serving on the federation's executive during the mid-1940s. TLC president Percy Bengough took special notice of Mathieu and recommended him to lead the federation's nascent organizing strategy, and corresponding campaign, for packinghouse workers. Mathieu excelled at the challenge and helped create Montreal's first packinghouse workers' union, the Packinghouse Butchers and Allied Workers Union, which was chartered with the TLC. Mathieu served as the new union's first leader.

== Master bargaining in meat sector ==
Mathieu was a staunch supporter of the "One Industry, One Union" movement and in 1946 he led the Packinghouse Butchers and Allied Workers Union toward a merger with the United Packinghouse Workers of America (UPWA).

Always keen to put the full might of the UPWA to the cause, Mathieu led the negotiating committee that struck the "big three" of Canada's meat-packing industry: Canada Packers, Burns, and Swift in 1947. The action further secured the master bargaining model that was achieved for packinghouse workers during the Second World War.

The model won through Mathieu's negotiating prowess and the leadership of UPWA Canadian Director Fred Dowling became the standard across Canada, and ushered in a new era of higher living standards for generations of packinghouse workers. The system survived until the mid-1980s when Burns triggered a decade long period of brinkmanship and excessively hard bargaining that resulted in some of the largest and most violent strikes in Canadian history, and ultimately led to the end of pattern bargaining in the country's meat sector.

Beyond the meat sector, Mathieu was often called upon by other unions or central labour federations to get the parties beyond impasse, including the nationwide postal strike in 1968, which was ultimately resolved by him after the Canadian Union of Postal Workers invited Romeo to act as their chief negotiator.

== Building solidarity in Quebec ==
Through the 1940s, dual federations and unions competed for affiliates and sectors, which thereby allowed employers to pit one union against another.

Mathieu, in addition to crafting mergers within his own unions and sectors, played a key role in merging Quebec's labour federations. In particular, he made a significant contribution to the creation, expansion and development of the province's main labour body, the Fédération des travailleurs et travailleuses du Québec (FTQ)/Quebec Federation of Labour (QFL).

The FTQ/QFL was the result of the 1957 merger of the Provincial Federation of Labour of Québec (PFLQ) and the Federation of Industrial Trade Unions of Québec (FITQ)/Fédération des unions industrielles du Québec (FUIQ), where Mathieu served as the secretary-general, and displayed tremendous leadership in spearheading the effort to bring the two federations together.

As the FTQ's first secretary-general, Mathieu helped orient the new Quebec labour federation toward the more militant approach favoured by the industrial unions of the FITQ (i.e., in contrast to the less militant approach of the craft unions of the PFLQ). Unlike other labour federations in the province, the FTQ kept its distance from the Maurice Duplessis government, took some militant stands – in keeping with its industrial tendencies – like the Murdochville Strike in 1957, and, eventually, supported the New Democratic Party of Canada, once it was founded in 1961.

Mathieu played an important role in the creation of the Canadian Labour Congress in 1956, following the merger of the TLC and the Canadian Congress of Labour, where Romeo served on the executive council. From 1956 until his retirement in 1983, Mathieu served as a vocal and highly respected member of the CLC's executive board.

== Quiet Revolution ==
In the political arena, and in the leading intellectual and social movements of his day, Mathieu joined other young activist – such as Pierre Trudeau, Gérard Pelletier, Jean Marchand, Philippe Vaillancourt, Jean-Paul Lefebvre, and René Lévesque – in pushing for the fall of the Maurice Duplessis regime, and the rise of the Quiet Revolution, which began in the 1960s and left an indelible impact on Quebec.

Firmly committed to his belief that political action and trade unionism were, and must be, interwoven, Mathieu is quoted as saying. "A worker is every bit a citizen too and the two can never be separated. It is sheer irresponsibility for unions to concern themselves with only work-place problems."

== Merging the food workers ==
In keeping with Mathieu's lifelong commitment to the "One industry, one union" concept, he played a pivotal role in the merger between the United Packinghouse Workers of America and the Amalgamated Meat Cutters and Butcher Workmen of North America (AMCBW) in 1968, creating the Canadian Food and Allied Workers (CFAW) in Canada (for internal political reasons); however, in the United States UPWA ceased to exist as a brand, and its members became members of the AMCBW. Following the merger in Canada, the CFAW was led by the indefatigable Fred Dowling as its leader, and Mathieu serving as the obvious second-in-command and heir apparent. Upon Dowling's retirement in 1973, Mathieu became the leader of the CFAW, and, as such, the Canadian director of the AMCBW.

Six years later, Mathieu, once again, played a defining role in yet another major merger. This time with the creation of the United Food and Commercial Workers International Union in 1979, which, in Quebec, would have relied upon Romeo's very seasoned and sage hand leading the way.

From 1979 until his retirement in 1983, Mathieu served the UFCW as an international vice-president, and as the director of region 18, which included all of the new union's Canadian members who once belonged the Amalgamated Meat Cutters.

== Awards ==
On October 5, 1983, Mathieu became one of very few labour leaders to be invested into the Order of Canada for his role as "the former regional director and vice-president of the United Food and Commercial Workers International Union and founder of the Fédération des Unions industrielles du Québec. In recognition of nearly a half century of hard work on behalf of his union brothers and sisters as a labour leader and negotiator."

In appreciation for his role in creating the union – and the five decades of activism and commitment that helped make it possible – UFCW Local Unions in Canada, by way of the UFCW Canada national council, established an annual scholarship in Mathieu's honour, which every year awards 18 $1,000 scholarship prizes to UFCW Canada members or their children, toward post-secondary tuition and associated costs.

Romeo Mathieu died in Montreal in April, 1989.
