= Huguette Plamondon =

Canadian trade unionist

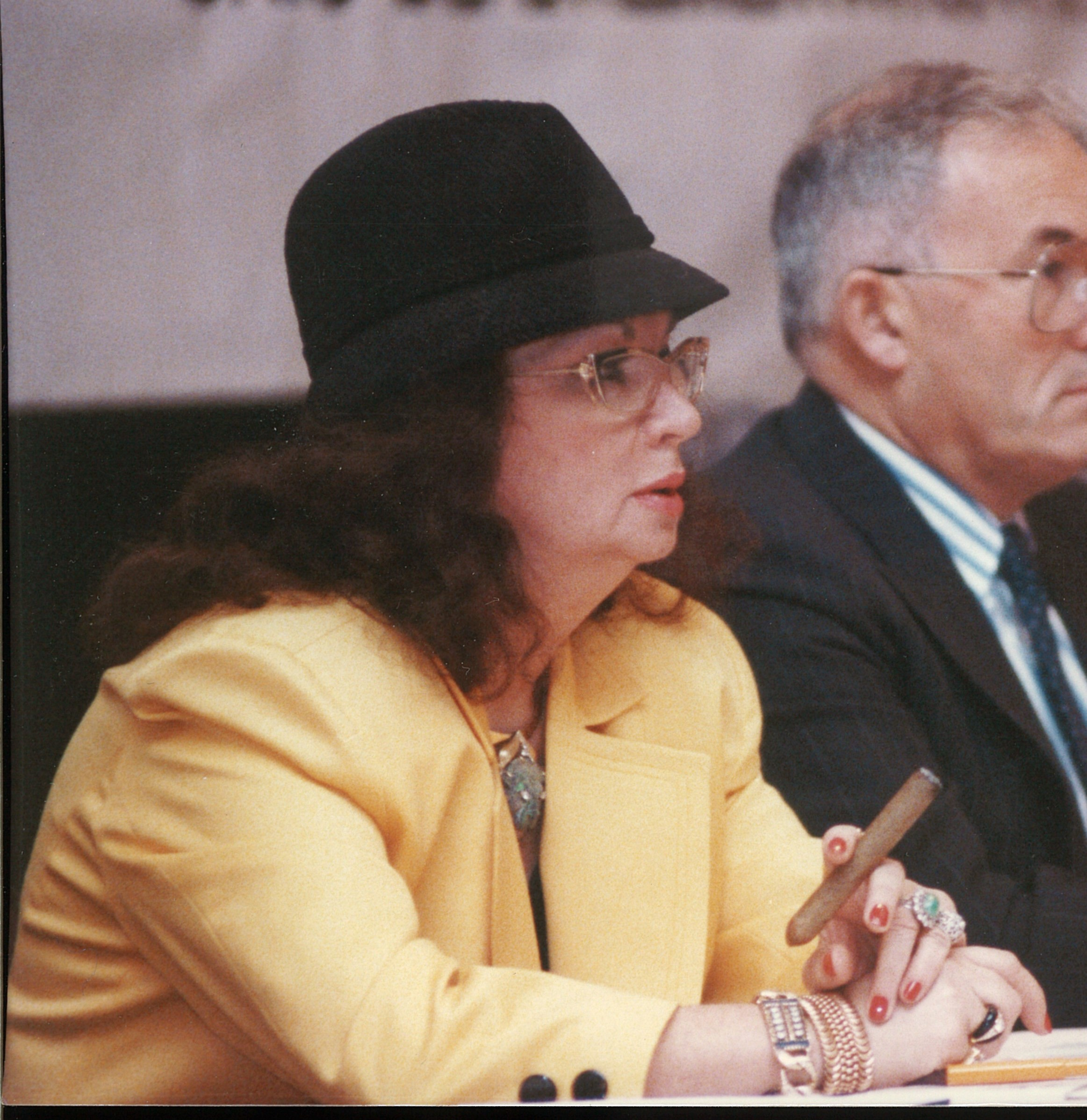

International Vice-President of the United Food and Commercial Workers
- In office 1987–1994
- President: William H. Wynn; Douglas H. Dority

Personal details
- Born: January 6, 1926 Quebec, Canada
- Died: September 29, 2010 (aged 84) Montreal, Quebec, Canada
- Party: Co-operative Commonwealth Federation; New Democratic Party
- Spouse: Romeo Mathieu
- Occupation: Trade unionist

Huguette Plamondon (January 6, 1926 - September 29, 2010) was a trade unionist in Quebec, Canada. A trailblazer and leader in the Quebec, Canadian and international labour movements, she dedicated the bulk of her efforts to representing the United Packinghouse Workers of America and then the United Food and Commercial Workers, after the UPWA merged with the Amalgamated Meat Cutters in 1979 to create the UFCW. She also served as a vice-president of the Canadian Labour Congress from 1956 until 1988.

== Early life ==
Plamondon was born on January 6, 1926, in Montreal. Her father was a member of the Brotherhood of Railway Carmen of America. She entered the labour force as a stenographer at a steel plant, and when the United Steelworkers of America started organizing the plant, Huguette became one of the campaign's most militant supporters.

== Activism and career ==
In 1945, at the age of 19, Huguette Plamondon started working as a secretary in the Montreal office of the United Packinghouse Workers of America (UPWA). Shortly thereafter, she started organizing meatpacking workers in Montreal, and began a decades long career as a voice for food workers and for one of North America's largest and unions.

She became a member of the Montreal Labour Council (Conseil du travail de Montréal) in 1953, which at that time was affiliated to the Congress of Industrial Organizations (CIO). In 1955 she was elected president of the Montreal Labour Council, and served in that role until 1958, thus becoming the first woman in Canada to lead a major labour organization. In 1956, she participated in the Rassemblement, a short-lived political movement led by Pierre Dansereau and Pierre Trudeau.

In 1956, she was elected a vice-president of the Canadian Labour Congress, thus becoming the first woman to achieve a Canada-wide union executive position. She held that office for 32 years, until 1988.

From 1961 until 1966, she was a member of the Quebec Council of Economic Planification (Conseil de planification économique du Québec). In 1973, she was a member of the Economic Council of Canada.

She was vice-president of the New Democratic Party, nominating Tommy Douglas for leader in 1961.

She served as an International Vice-President of the United Food and Commercial Workers. She was also the president of UFCW Canada Local 744P in Quebec. Near the end of her career, she was Executive Assistant to the UFCW Canadian Director, Clifford R. Evans.

She was married to Romeo Mathieu, also a trade unionist. She died of a heart attack in 2010, at the age of 84.
