= Patrick Gorman =

Patrick Gorman may refer to:

- Patrick Gorman (politician) (born 1984), Australian politician
- Patrick Gorman (American actor) (born 1934), American actor
- Patrick E. Gorman (1892–1980), American trade unionist
- Pat Gorman (1931–2019), British actor
- Eugene Gorman (1891–1973), known as Pat, Australian barrister and military officer

== See also ==
- MacGorman, also Gorman, an Irish clan
