= Plamondon =

Plamondon may refer to:

== People with the surname ==
- Antoine Plamondon (c. 1804–1895), Canadian artist
- Bob Plamondon (born 1957), Canadian portrait painter
- Charles Plamondon (born 1961), Canadian biathlete
- Crystal Plamondon (born 1963), Canadian country music singer
- Gerry Plamondon (1924–2019), Canadian ice hockey player
- Huguette Plamondon (1926–2010), Canadian trade unionist
- Louis Plamondon (born 1943), Canadian politician
- Louis Plamondon (lawyer) (1785–1828), lawyer and militia officer in Lower Canada
- Luc Plamondon (born 1942), Canadian musician
- Madeleine Plamondon (born 1931), Canadian senator and consumer advocate
- Marc-Aurèle Plamondon (1823–1900), Canadian judge
- Marius Plamondon (1914–1976), Canadian sculptor and stained glass artist
- Pascal Plamondon (born 1992), Canadian weightlifter
- Paul St-Pierre Plamondon (born 1977), Canadian politician
- Pun Plamondon (born 1945), American activist

== Places ==
- Plamondon, Alberta, a hamlet in northern Alberta, Canada
- Plamondon Bay, a body of water in the western part of the Gouin Reservoir in La Tuque, Quebec, Canada
- Plamondon Creek, a tributary of the Gouin Reservoir in La Tuque, Quebec, Canada
- Plamondon River, a tributary of the Harricana River, mostly in Eeyou Istchee Baie-James, Quebec, Canada
- Plamondon station, of the Montreal Metro
