= Homer D. Call =

American trade unionist and politician (1843–1929)

1st International Secretary-Treasurer of the Amalgamated Meat Cutters and Butcher Workmen of North America
- In office 1917–1942
- Preceded by: Position established
- Succeeded by: Dennis Lane

Personal details
- Born: September 19, 1843 Truxton, New York, U.S.
- Died: April, 1929
- Party: Progressive Party
- Occupation: Butcher, trade unionist

Homer D. Call (September 19, 1843 – April 1929) was an American labor leader and politician.

== Biography ==
Homer D. Call was born on September 19, 1843, in Truxton, New York.

On October 1, 1861, he enrolled at Cortland, New York, and was mustered in as corporal of the 76th NY Volunteers to fight in the American Civil War. On December 13, 1862, he was wounded in the Battle of Fredericksburg. In July 1863, he was commissioned a second lieutenant, and in February 1864 a first lieutenant. He was captured in action on May 5, 1864, during the Battle of the Wilderness, later paroled, and discharged in February 1865.

After the war, he settled in Syracuse, New York, and worked as a meat cutter, and later ran a meat market and grocery. He was Secretary and Treasurer of the Butchers and Meat Cutters of North America from 1897 to 1917, and a vice president of the American Federation of Labor.

In 1912, he ran on the Progressive and Independence League tickets for Secretary of State of New York, but was defeated by Democrat Mitchell May. After the suicide of Treasurer John J. Kennedy on February 15, 1914, neither Democrats nor Republicans had a majority on joint ballot in the New York State Legislature due to the presence of 19 Progressive members. The Progressives offered the Republicans a deal, but were turned down. Then they combined with the Democrats and, on February 25, elected Call New York State Treasurer to fill Kennedy's unexpired term (98 votes for Call, 96 votes for the Republican candidate William Archer) with the understanding that the Democratic officials, including Deputy Treasurer George W. Batten would continue at their posts in the Treasury. In November 1914, Call ran on the Progressive and Independence League tickets for re-election, but was defeated by Republican James L. Wells.

Party political offices
First	Progressive nominee for Secretary of State of New York; 1912	Succeeded by Sydney W. Stern
Preceded by Ernest Cawcroft	Progressive nominee for New York State Treasurer; 1914	Succeeded by None
Trade union offices
Preceded by Union founded	Secretary-Treasurer of the Amalgamated Meat Cutters and Butcher Workmen of North America; 1897–1917	Succeeded by Dennis Lane
Political offices
Preceded by George W. Batten; Acting	New York State Treasurer; 1914	Succeeded by James L. Wells
