= Thomas B. Dunn =

American politician (1853–1924)

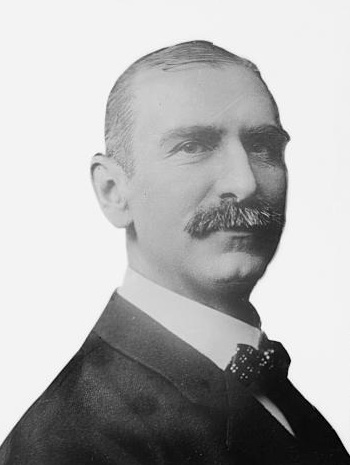
- Portrait of Dunn by George Grantham Bain, c. 1920

Member of the U.S. House of Representatives from New York's 38th district
- In office March 4, 1913 – March 3, 1923
- Preceded by: District created
- Succeeded by: Meyer Jacobstein

Member of the New York Senate from the 45th district
- In office 1907–1908
- Preceded by: Irving L'Hommedieu
- Succeeded by: George L. Meade

New York State Treasurer
- In office 1909–1910
- Preceded by: Julius Hauser
- Succeeded by: John J. Kennedy

Personal details
- Born: Thomas Byrne Dunn; March 16, 1853 Providence, Rhode Island, US
- Died: July 2, 1924 (aged 71) Rochester, New York, US
- Resting place: Mount Hope Cemetery
- Party: Republican

Thomas Byrne Dunn (March 16, 1853 – July 2, 1924) was an American politician. A Republican, he was a member of the United States House of Representatives from New York.

Born in Providence, Rhode Island, Dunn lived in Rochester, New York. He worked as a perfumer and created the Sen-Sen mint. He served in the New York State Senate and as New York State Treasurer. He was a member of the House from 1913 to 1923.

== Biography ==
Dunn was born on March 16, 1853, in Providence, Rhode Island. In 1857, he moved to Rochester, New York. Educated at public schools, he attended the De Graff Military Institute. He worked as an extract and perfume manufacturer, being the creator of Sen-Sen, a type of mint.

Dunn was an Old Right Republican. He was a delegate to the Jamestown Exposition. In 1907 and 1908, he represented the 45h district in the New York State Senate, then from January 1, 1909, to December 31, 1910, was the New York State Treasurer.

Dunn was a member of the United States House of Representatives from March 4, 1913, to March 3, 1923, representing New York's 38th district. During the 66th and 67th United States Congresses, he was chairman of the Committee on Roads. He was not nominated for the following election. He was an alternate delegate to the 1920 Republican National Convention. Politically, he was conservative.

Dunn retired from electoral politics after serving in Congress. In 1889, he married Florence L. Robinson, with whom he had two children. He was a Freemason. He died on July 2, 1924, aged 71, in Rochester, and was buried in a mausoleum at Mount Hope Cemetery, in Rochester. A stained glass window of the mausoleum was The Sunset Scene, which was donated to the Memorial Art Gallery in 2002.

Party political offices
Preceded by John G. Wallenmeier Jr.	Republican nominee for New York State Treasurer; 1908	Succeeded by Tom Fennell
Political offices
Preceded by Irving L'Hommedieu	New York State Senate; 45th District; 1907–1908	Succeeded by George L. Meade
Preceded by Julius Hauser	New York State Treasurer; 1909–1910	Succeeded by John J. Kennedy
U.S. House of Representatives
Preceded by new district	Member of the U.S. House of Representatives from New York's 38th congressional district 1913–1923	Succeeded by Meyer Jacobstein
