= Canadian Food and Allied Workers =

Canadian meatpacking labour union

- Abbreviation: CFAW
- Merged into: United Food and Commercial Workers
- Formation: 1968
- Dissolved: 1979
- Type: Trade union
- Location: Canada
- Key people: Fred Dowling; Romeo Mathieu; Clarence Lyons
- Parent organization: Amalgamated Meat Cutters
- Affiliations: Canadian Labour Congress

The Canadian Food and Allied Workers (CFAW) was a Canadian meatpacking labour union which existed from 1968 until 1979. It was created as a result of a merger between Canadian locals of the Amalgamated Meat Cutters (AMC) and the United Packinghouse Workers of America (UPWA). In 1979, it merged with the Retail Clerks International Union (RCIU) along with its American counterpart (which had maintained the AMC name) to form the United Food and Commercial Workers (UFCW).

== History ==
=== Origins ===
The Canadian Food and Allied Workers came into existence during a time of turbulence in the Canadian political sphere, as well as rapid industrial consolidation, followed by consolidation of the unions in these industries. It also marked the consolidation of two different traditions of unionism in the meatpacking industry: the craft unionism exemplified by the older Amalgamated Meat Cutters (AMC), created during the late-19th-century heyday of the American Federation of Labor (AFL), and the militant industrial unionism of the United Packinghouse Workers of America (UPWA), which grew out of the wave of 1930s Great Depression-era organizing resulting from the foundation of the Congress of Industrial Organizations (CIO).

By the late 1960s, steps began to be taken to merge the two unions, which had a history of rivalry and competition for membership due to their overlapping membership categories. In Canada, the most dynamic and progressive leadership came from the leaders and organizers of the former United Packinghouse Workers, such as Fred Dowling, known as "Mr. Packinghouse", and Romeo Mathieu, his protégé. The merger was completed in 1968, with the American UPWA membership being absorbed into the AMC, while in Canada the CFAW was formed as a neutral path forward for the combined membership.

=== Fisheries organizing ===
The CFAW leadership had a history in the Canadian social-democratic political tradition of the Cooperative Commonwealth Federation (CCF) and the New Democratic Party (NDP), as well as the efforts toward social change in Québec's Quiet Revolution. As a result, attempts were made to target areas of the industry known for difficult working and organizing conditions, where unionization would have the most socially transformative effect. The first such case was the initiative by Newfoundland fishery workers to organize a union. The workers had been organizing since the late 1960s with the support of Father Desmond McGrath (a Catholic parish priest) and Richard Cashin (a former Liberal MP). The campaign faced a provincial government armed with strong anti-union powers and laws in the wake of the failed International Woodworkers of America loggers campaign of the 1950s, as well as the fact that workers in the fishing industry were broadly exempt from provincial minimum wage regulations. In 1970, this culminated in the founding of the Fish, Food and Allied Workers Union (originally called the Newfoundland Food, Fishermen, and Allied Workers), which would outlast the CFAW as an organization. The FFAW's organizing efforts led to a wave of nationalization and cooperativization efforts in the Newfoundland fishing industry throughout the 1970s, along with reforms to provincial regulations.

=== Prisoner meatpackers union ===
Throughout the rest of the 1970s, the CFAW would engage in militant labour action, such as a sit-in at a Canada Packers plant in Clearbrook, British Columbia to prevent a lockout action by the company. These efforts would only accelerate toward the end of the decade with the CFAW's boldest campaign, to organize prisoner meatpackers in 1977 at an experimental prison labour facility in Guelph, Ontario.

In the late 1960s and early 1970s, the province of Ontario's Ministry of Correctional Services (MCS) engaged in several prison labour reforms designed to assimilate lower-risk prisoners into the general workforce as a form of prison privatization. This consisted of the Temporary Absence Program (TAP) of 1969 and the Outside Managed Industrial Programs (OMIPs) which began in 1974. The ministry's primary justifications were that it would allow a "leaner" administration of the prison system, as well as potentially alleviating labour shortages in key industries. Prisoners would ultimately be employed under OMIPs in industries such as food service and catering, manufacturing, and meatpacking. Similarly to psychiatric institutions, the government had begun to divest itself of the industrial farms attached to large state-run institutions in preparation for shutting down and/or restructuring them. At the Guelph Correctional Centre, productive activities shifted away from animal-raising and toward meatpacking, as well as toward privatization, beginning with the abattoir.

From the start, the Ontario Federation of Labour (OFL) raised concerns about the OMIP program for undermining private sector wages, while the CFAW sought assurances that the Guelph abattoir would not operate if a strike was declared at a "parent industry" company. In 1975, the MCS signed a ten-year contract with Essex Packers Limited. At the time, Essex Packers was suffering from significant financial issues, and its annual losses allowed it significant income tax rebates and other government support. The program was fraught with management issues, as it was soon found that prisoners were concentrated among the least desirable abattoir jobs, and were not clearly represented in the in-house employee council at the company. In November 1975, Essex Packers went bankrupt. By March 1976, however, the abattoir had new management in the form of the Guelph Beef Centre Incorporated, and was managed by Bernard deJonge, of the deJonge meatpacking business family.

By the beginning of 1977, CFAW organizing efforts were underway, and an application for recognition was sent to the Ontario Labour Relations Board (OLRB). There was no legal precedent for the unionization of prisoners in Canada, so OLRB deliberations were slow, but informed by parallel efforts toward prisoner unionization in the United States. Ultimately, the OLRB found prisoner-workers at the Guelph Beef Centre to be both eligible for coverage under the Ontario Labour Relations Act and to be employees of the Guelph Beef Centre, making them able to petition for union recognition. As a result, the union was certified, and noted as being the "first bargaining unit in Canada and possibly North America to represent both inmate and civilian employees." Ultimately, The CAFW Local 240 presence at the plant would outlast the prisoner workforce there (as well as the CAFW itself as an independent organization), as by the 1990s the OMIP had become virtually defunct and prisoners were no longer mentioned in any collective agreements signed under the CAFW's successor, the UFCW.

=== Merger and legacy ===
The CFAW's unofficial founder, Fred Dowling, had retired in 1972, but his successor as president, Romeo Mathieu, guided the CFAW through its merger with the Retail Clerks International Union (RCIU) into what would become the UFCW in 1979. Afterward, Mathieu became the UFCW's international vice-president, as well as the director of UFCW Region 18, which represented the former CFAW membership, alongside Clifford R. Evans, who represented the former RCIU members in Region 19. Mathieu retired in 1983. In the 1980s, amid rising Canadian nationalism in the labour movement, the Canadian Auto Workers (CAW) formed as a split from the United Auto Workers (UAW) and began campaigning for a process to exist for Canadian sections to leave their international bodies and become independent or merge with Canadian unions. In March 1987, Richard Cashin, the FFAW (then UFCW Local 1252) president, negotiated an agreement for the local to leave the UFCW and join the CAW. This was followed in 1988 with the merger of Regions 18 and 19 of the UFCW, eliminating some of the last traces of the CFAW's existence.
