= 1912 New York state election =

1912 New York gubernatorial election
- November 5–6, 1912
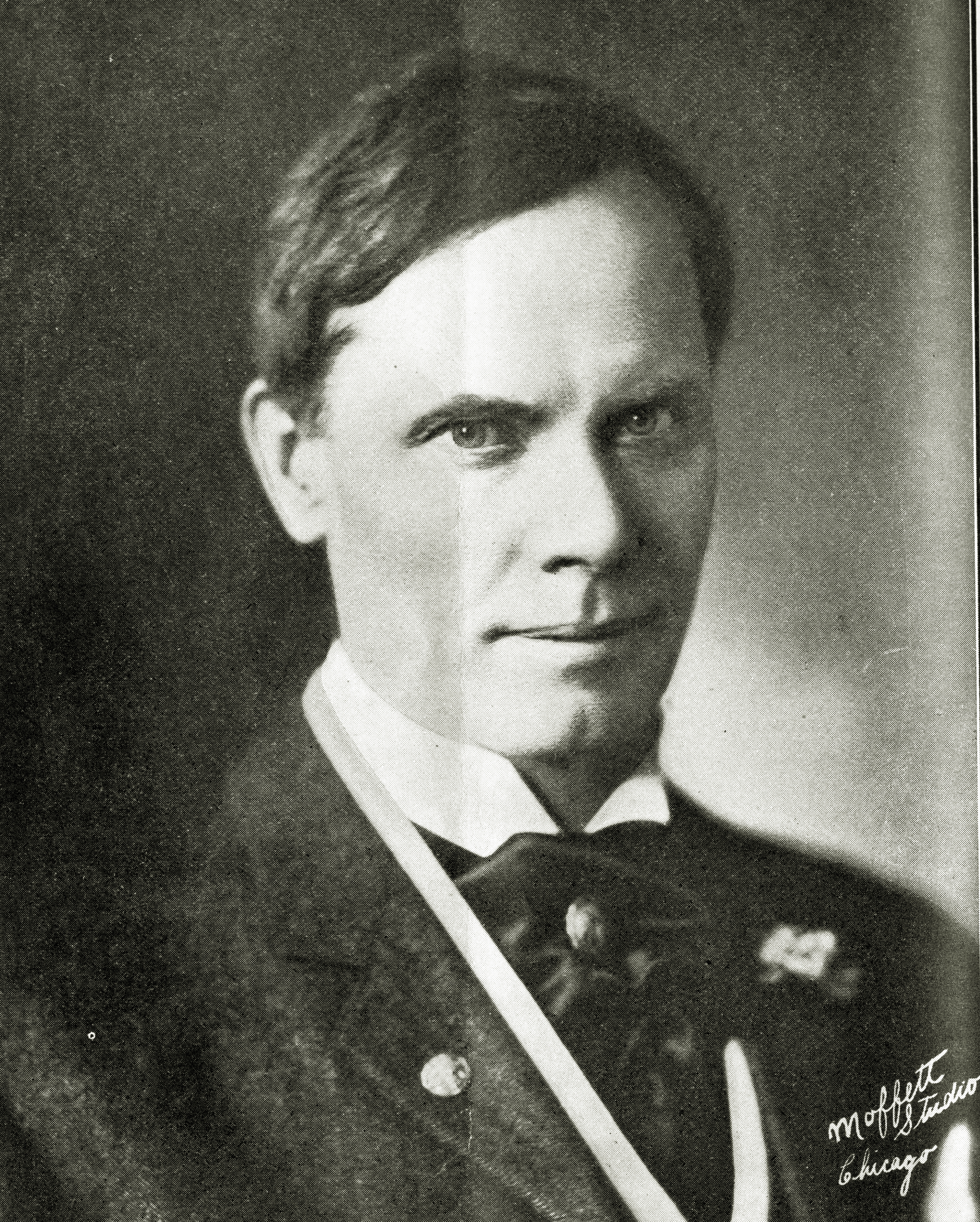

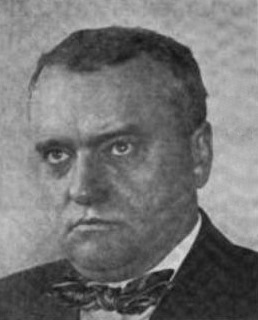

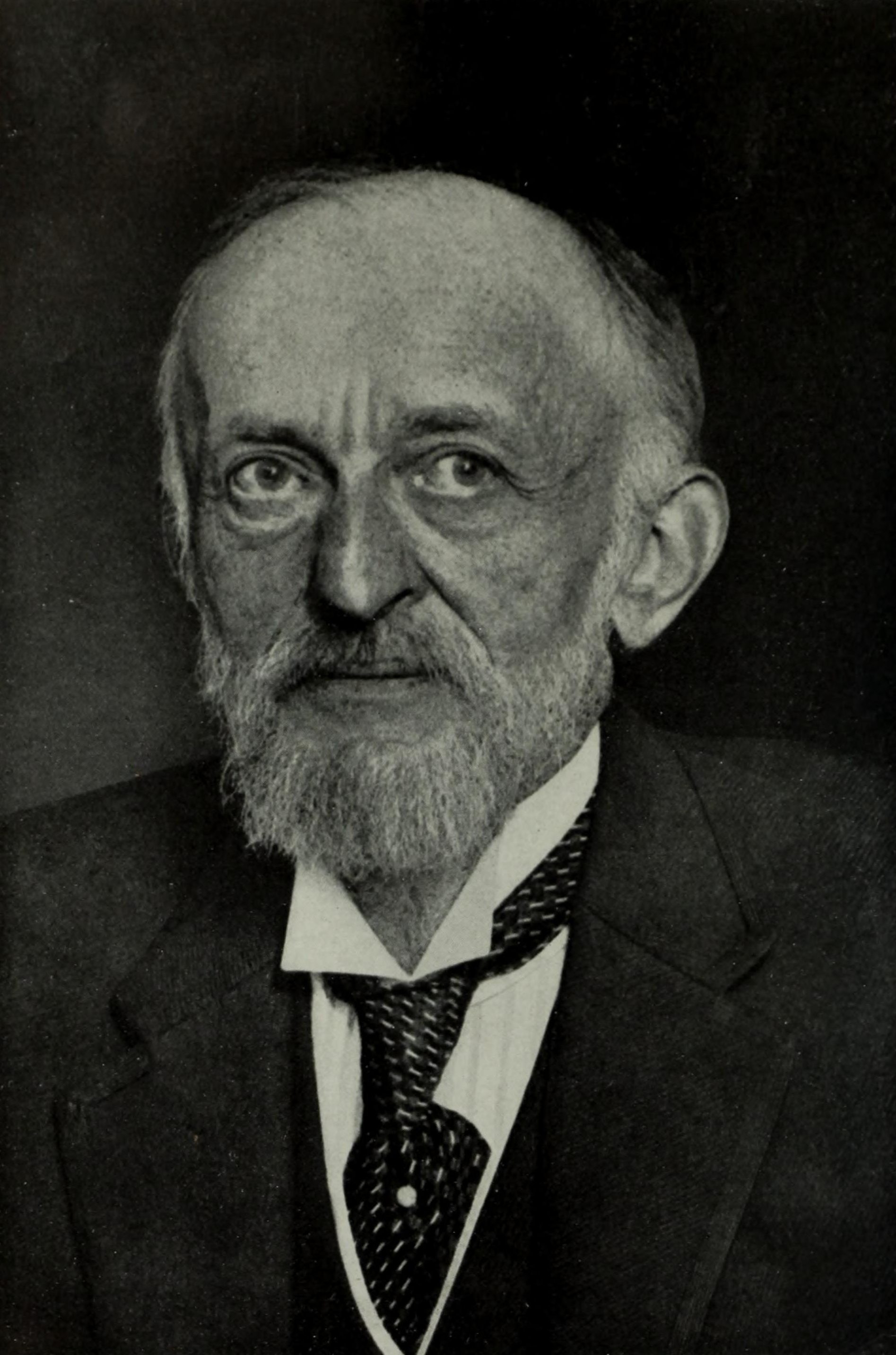
Nominee	William Sulzer	Job E. Hedges	Oscar Straus
Party	Democratic	Republican	Progressive
Alliance			Independence
Popular vote	649,559	444,105	393,183
Percentage	47.69%	28.35%	25.10%
- County results Sulzer: 30–40% 40–50% 50–60% Hedges: 30–40% 40–50%
Governor before election
John Alden Dix
Democratic
Elected Governor
William Sulzer
Democratic

The 1912 New York state election was held on November 5, 1912, to elect the governor, the lieutenant governor, the Secretary of State, the state comptroller, the attorney general, the state treasurer, the state engineer and two judges (to fill the vacancies caused by the retirement of Albert Haight and Irving G. Vann who reached the constitutional age-limit) of the New York Court of Appeals, as well as all members of the New York State Assembly and the New York State Senate. The voters were also asked if they approved a $50,000,000 bond issue for "good roads construction", which was answered in the affirmative, with 657,548 in favor and 281,265 against.

== History ==
The Socialist state convention met on June 30 at Auburn, New York. They nominated again, like in 1910, Charles Edward Russell for governor; Gustave Adolph Strebel for lieutenant governor; and Henry L. Slobodin for attorney general. They also nominated Carrie W. Allen, of Onondaga County, for secretary of state; Olin Hoxie Smith, of Schenectady, for comptroller; Frank Ehrenfried, of Erie County, for treasurer; and Dr. Charles H. Furman, of Brooklyn, for state engineer.

The Progressive state convention met on September 6 at Syracuse, New York. Oscar S. Straus was chairman. The convention nominated Straus for governor by acclamation amid great noise after the name of New York City Comptroller William A. Prendergast, the bosses' and Theodore Roosevelt's choice, was withdrawn by Timothy L. Woodruff.

The Republican state convention met on September 27 at Saratoga Springs, New York.

The Democratic state convention met on October 2 at Syracuse, New York. Alton B. Parker was elected permanent chairman with 412 votes against 33 for John K. Sague, the Mayor of Poughkeepsie. Congressman William Sulzer was nominated for governor after the third ballot (first ballot: John Alden Dix [incumbent] 147, Sulzer 136, Herman A. Metz 70, Martin H. Glynn 46, George H. Burd 28, Francis Burton Harrison 21, William Sohmer 1; second ballot: Sulzer 141, Dix 124, Metz 68, Glynn 48, Burd 28, Harrison 27, Sohmer 2, Robert F. Wagner 2, James Aloysius O'Gorman 1, Victor J. Dowling 1; third ballot: Sulzer 195, Dix 87, Metz 76, Glynn 41, Harrison 21, Burd 9, Dowling 4, Wagner 3, O'Gorman 1, Ellison 1, George W. Batten 1, James W. Gerard 1; then Dix and Metz withdrew, and Sulzer was chosen). Ex-Comptroller Martin H. Glynn (in office 1907–08) was nominated for lieutenant governor by acclamation, and the convention adjourned an hour after midnight. The convention met again on October 3, and nominated Mitchell May for secretary of state; re-nominated the other incumbent state officers Sohmer, Carmody, Kennedy and Bensel; and nominated William H. Cuddeback and John W. Hogan for the Court of Appeals.

The Independence League state convention met on October 3 at Arlington Hall in New York City. James A. Allen was Temporary and Permanent Chairman. They nominated Progressive Oscar S. Straus for Governor with 89 votes against 79 for Democrat William Sulzer, and then adjourned The convention met again on October 4, and nominated a ticket made up by Democrats Glynn, Sohmer and Cuddeback; Progressives Call, Palmieri, Leland and Kirchwey; and the only Independence Leaguer John Davis for treasurer. William Randolph Hearst himself endorsed Sulzer and Glynn.

== Result ==
The whole Democratic ticket was elected in a three-cornered race.

The incumbents Sohmer, Carmody, Kennedy and Bensel were re-elected.

The Republican, Democratic, Independence League, Socialist and Prohibition parties maintained automatic ballot status (necessary 10,000 votes), the Progressive Party attained it, and the Socialist Labor Party did not re-attain it.

1912 state election results
Office	Democratic ticket		Republican ticket		Progressive ticket		Socialist ticket		Prohibition ticket		Independence League ticket		Socialist Labor ticket	
Governor	William Sulzer	649,559	Job E. Hedges	444,105	Oscar S. Straus	393,183	Charles Edward Russell	56,917	T. Alexander MacNicholl	18,990	Oscar S. Straus		John Hall	4,461
Lieutenant Governor	Martin H. Glynn	665,762	James W. Wadsworth, Jr.	450,539	Frederick M. Davenport	351,427	Gustave A. Strebel	60,481	Clark Allis	19,764	Martin H. Glynn		Jeremiah D. Crowley	4,669
Secretary of State	Mitchell May	649,073	Francis M. Hugo	460,651	Homer D. Call	353,170	Carrie W. Allen	61,548	Ben D. Wright	20,240	Homer D. Call		Edmund Moonelis	4,396
Comptroller	William Sohmer	658,392	William D. Cunningham	463,901	Horatio C. King	341,706	Olin Hoxie Smith	61,457	Bernard Clauson	19,793	William Sohmer		Robert Downs	3,865
Attorney General	Thomas Carmody	651,875	Meier Steinbrink	457,838	John Palmieri	354,450	Henry L. Slobodin	61,284	Ernest H. Woodruff	20,175	John Palmieri		John Joss	3,867
Treasurer	John J. Kennedy	650,530	William Archer	458,174	Ernest Cawcroft	341,581	Frank Ehrenfried	61,311	Arthur A. Amidon	19,902	John Davis	12,672	Henry Kuhn	3,872
State Engineer	John A. Bensel	649,839	Frank M. Williams	461,822	Ora Miner Leland	357,226	Charles H. Furman	61,587	Van Cleve C. Mott	19,950	Ora Miner Leland		Thomas J. DeLee	4,545
Judge of the Court of Appeals	William H. Cuddeback	654,626	Frank H. Hiscock	470,895	Carlos C. Alden	336,918	Jessie Ashley	61,588	Erwin J. Baldwin	19,537	William H. Cuddeback		Edmund Seidel	4,281
Judge of the Court of Appeals	John W. Hogan	642,004	Emory A. Chase	467,743	George W. Kirchwey	348,887	Leon A. Malkiel	61,094	Gilbert Elliott	19,443	George W. Kirchwey		Carl A. Luedecke	4,265

Obs.:

- Numbers are total votes on Progressive and Independence League tickets for Straus, Call, Palmieri, Leland and Kirchwey; and total votes on Democratic and Independence League tickets for Glynn, Sohmer and Cuddeback.
- Analyzing the totals, the average strength of the Independence League was about 12,000 votes.

== See also ==
- New York gubernatorial elections

== Sources ==
- Result: WILSON'S STATE PLURALITY in NYT on December 20, 1912
- Result in the New York Red Book (1913)
- Result: The Tribune Almanac 1913
