= George W. Batten =

American businessman and politician

George Washington Batten (February 22, 1856 – September 14, 1922) was an American businessman and politician.

== Life ==
He was the son of Joseph Batten, Sheriff of Niagara County from 1876 to 1878. He was Undersheriff from 1882 to 1884. He was Sheriff from 1885 to 1887, and appointed his father Undersheriff. Afterwards he entered the insurance business.

He was Chairman of the Democratic Committee of Niagara County from 1890 to 1895, and a member of the New York State Democratic Committee from 1895 to 1915. In 1898, he ran for Secretary of State of New York, but was defeated by Republican John T. McDonough.

He was Deputy Treasurer under Julius Hauser and John J. Kennedy, and became Acting New York State Treasurer upon the suicide in office of Kennedy on February 15, 1914. Ten days later, Progressive Homer D. Call was elected by the Progressive and Democratic members of the New York State Legislature to fill Kennedy's unexpired term with the understanding that Batten and all other Democratic officials continue on their posts at the Treasury.

== Sources ==
- Past Niagara County Sheriffs
- THE DEMOCRATIC TICKET in NYT on September 30, 1898
- The Niagara Falls Charter killed, in NYT on April 22, 1903
- The senatorial special election, in NYT on April 17, 1908
- The senatorial deal, in NYT on April 24, 1908
- Kennedy's suicide, in NYT on February 17, 1914
- Call elected, in NYT on February 26, 1914
- Obit in NYT on September 15, 1922

Political offices
Preceded by John J. Kennedy	New York State Treasurer; Acting; 1914	Succeeded by Homer D. Call
