= The Sunset Scene =

Stained glass from 1915

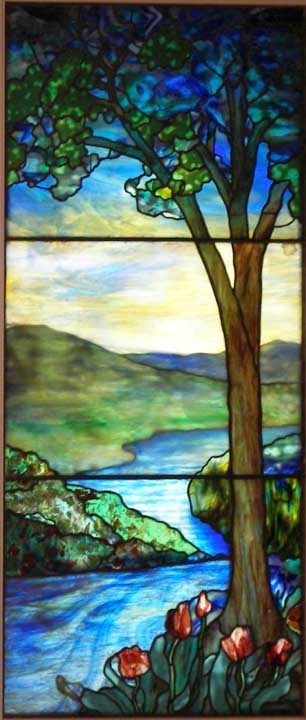
- Artist: Tiffany Studios
- Year: 1915
- Medium: Stained glass
- Subject: The beauty of nature and the essence of life and death
- Dimensions: 53 1/4 x 23 1/4 x 1 3/16 in. (135.3 x 59.1 x 3 cm)
- Location: Memorial Art Gallery, Rochester, New York

The Sunset Scene is an art glass window created around 1915 by Tiffany Studios, led by Louis Comfort Tiffany. This artwork was created to symbolize the voyage between life and death. Tiffany Studios manufactured many stained glass pieces using Tiffany glass, and this scene was created for Mount Hope Cemetery in Rochester, New York. It is held in the Memorial Art Gallery collection in Rochester, New York, gifted in memory of Mr. and Mrs. Thomas B. Dunn by their family in 2002.

== Description ==
The sunset scene is a leaded glass panel with a white wooden frame. The river suggests the movement of the water because of the transparent properties of the glass and the different types of glass used. The mountains are cast in shadow on the front side by the use of several layers of glass plates attached on the back side. This technique was developed by Tiffany Studios and is known as mottling. That technique is used throughout to create shadow and depth, both under the tree and among the plants where the mottled glass really adds the illusion of sunlight. Many of the techniques used for making these types of windows include many layers and colors to depict a different motion, or to complete and enhance the fullness of the view intended for the piece.
