= Dennis Lane =

American trade unionist (1881–1942)

2nd International Secretary-Treasurer of the Amalgamated Meat Cutters and Butcher Workmen of North America
- In office 1917–1942
- Preceded by: Homer D. Call
- Succeeded by: Patrick E. Gorman

Personal details
- Born: Chicago, U.S.
- Occupation: Butcher, trade unionist

Dennis Lane (1881 – August 10, 1942) was an American labor union leader.

Born in Chicago, Lane worked in the stockyards from an early age. He joined the Amalgamated Meat Cutters and Butcher Workmen of North America's Local 87, for cattle butchers. He took part in the major strike of 1904, as a result of which, he was sacked and blacklisted. He found work in other occupations for a few years, before coming to work as full-time organizer for the Meat Cutters.

In 1914, Lane was elected as vice-president of the Amalgamated Meat Cutters, and then in 1917, to the top position of secretary-treasurer. He led major organizing drives, which were successful during World War I, but foundered during the post-war depression. He led the union in a major strike in 1921, which was largely a failure. However, Lane remained in post, focusing on stabilizing the union, and promoting industrial unionism. Despite this position, he did not seek to affiliate the Meat Cutters to the Congress of Industrial Organizations, instead remaining loyal to the American Federation of Labor.

Lane died in 1942, still in office.

Trade union offices
Preceded by Homer D. Call	Secretary-Treasurer of the Amalgamated Meat Cutters and Butcher Workmen of North America; 1917–1942	Succeeded by Patrick E. Gorman
Preceded by Michael J. Colleran; Edward Flore	American Federation of Labor delegate to the Trades Union Congress; 1935; With: Henry F. Schmal	Succeeded by Edward Canavan; William J. McSorley
