= Ralph Helstein =

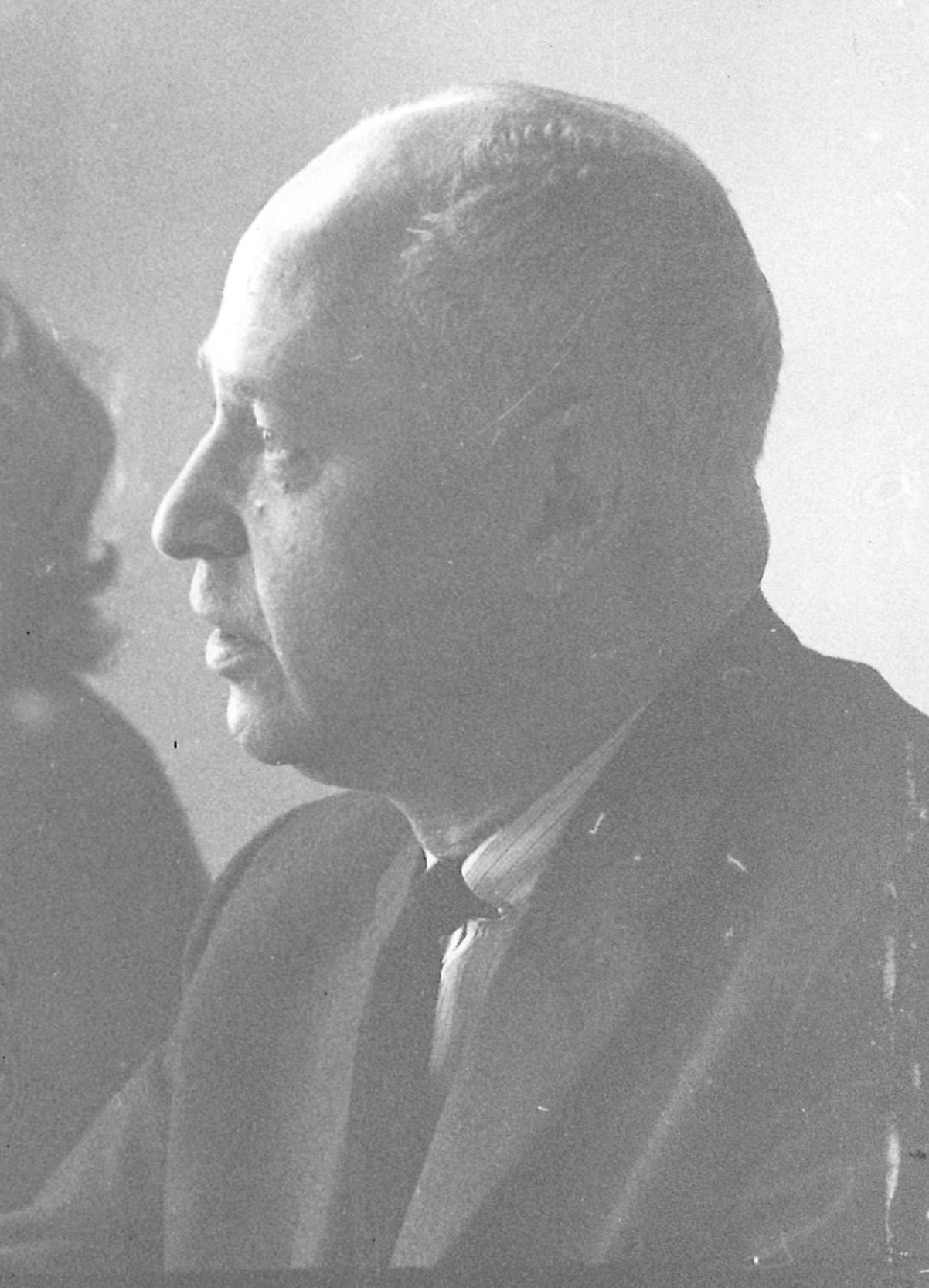

2nd International President of the United Packinghouse Workers of America
- In office 1946–1968
- Preceded by: Lewis J. Clark
- Succeeded by: Position dissolved

Personal details
- Born: December 11, 1908 Duluth, Minnesota
- Died: February 14, 1985 (aged 76) Chicago, Illinois
- Education: University of Minnesota (B.A., J.D.)
- Occupation: Lawyer; trade unionist

Ralph Helstein (11 December 1908 - 14 February 1985) was an American trade unionist and labour leader best known for leading the United Packinghouse Workers of America (UPWA) as international president from 1946 until 1968.

== Early years ==
Helstein was born in Duluth, Minnesota on December 11, 1908, to an orthodox Jewish family. When he was an infant, his father, a garment manufacturer, moved the household to Minneapolis. There, the Helstein family was part of the city's small but tight knit Jewish community, which came with its challenges. "As I was growing up, I had a strong feeling about this question of discrimation," recounted Helstein. "Part of it may be because I was Jewish and when I was a kid, the kids would go along yelling 'sheeny' and I'd be excluded."

There, Mr. Helstein graduated from the University of Minnesota, receiving a degree in English literature.

Helstein first aspired to a career in medicine, but dropped out of pre-med after he didn't see his name on a posted list of students who successfully passed a required examination. He later learned that it was an error on the school's part but, by then, he was studying law. He got his Juris Doctor degree from the University of Minnesota in 1934.

== Great Depression ==
It was the height of the Depression, and, enthusiastic about President Franklin Roosevelt's concerns and solutions, he went to work for the National Recovery Administration, helping to enforce minimum wage and hour provisions in Minnesota. When the NRA was abolished, he went into private law practice.

In 1939 Helstein began working with the Minnesota affiliate of the Congress of Industrial Organizations, and in 1942 was named general counsel for the Packinghouse Workers Organizing Committee, renamed the United Packinghouse Workers of America (UPWA) in 1943. In 1946, as the only individual trusted by both the left and right factions of a deeply divided union, he was elected international president. His first act as president was to lead an 82-day strike against the top U.S. meatpacking companies. Although the strike failed to achieve the pay raise he sought, it consolidated the union's grassroots strength. Under his leadership, the UPWA created an Anti-Discrimination Department in 1950, required every local to have its own anti-discrimination program, and insisted on anti-discrimination clauses in all contracts. Martin Luther King Jr., who called the UPWA a "pioneer" of the civil rights movement, described the union's support as "a mighty fortress protecting us." In October 1957, King was the keynote speaker at the union's Third National Anti-Discrimination Conference, at which Helstein presented King with $11,000 raised by UPWA members for the Southern Christian Leadership Conference's Fund for Democracy. In 1964, Helstein became one of King's closest advisers, meeting with him frequently to discuss the direction of the SCLC and to help draft his public statements. The UPWA donated 80 percent of the SCLC's first-year budget and provided ongoing funds for sit-ins, freedom rides, and student scholarships. UPWA members joined the 1963 March on Washington and the 1966 Chicago Campaign. In 1968, the UPWA merged with the Amalgamated Meat Cutters, ending Helstein's 22-year presidency.
