= Harry R. Poole =

Harry Ralston Poole (January 4, 1915 – July 7, 1994) was an American labor union leader.

Born in Bridgeville, Delaware, Poole became a meat cutter in Philadelphia in 1933, and immediately formed a new local of the Amalgamated Meat Cutters. From 1936, he served as business agent of the local, and then from 1940 was a full-time agent of the international union. He was elected as a vice-president of the union in 1944, and then as executive vice-president in 1955. He also served as president of the Food and Beverage Trade Department of the AFL-CIO.

In 1976, Poole was elected as president of the Meat Cutters. He led it into a merger with the Retail Clerks International Union, forming the United Food and Commercial Workers. On completion, in 1979, this was the largest merger in American labor union history. He became executive vice-president of the new union. From 1977, he also served as a vice-president of the AFL-CIO. He retired in 1981, and died in 1994.

Trade union offices
Preceded by Joseph Belsky	President of the Amalgamated Meat Cutters; 1976–1979	Succeeded by Union merged
Preceded by Union founded	Executive Vice-President of the United Food and Commercial Workers; 1979–1981	Succeeded by Stephen Coyle
