= Adelbert J. McCormick =

American politician

Adelbert J. McCormick (December 16, 1845 – December 27, 1903) was an American merchant and politician from New York.

== Life ==
McCormick was born on December 16, 1845, in Ridgeway, New York, the son of Nelson McCormick. He attended Medina Academy.

McCormick attended the University of Rochester, graduating from there in 1869. He was a member of Psi Upsilon. He then worked as principal of a Fayetteville school from 1869 to 1872. He then returned to Ridgeway, where he was a dealer in Medina sandstone. He served as town supervisor for four terms.

In 1891, McCormick was elected to the New York State Assembly as a Republican, representing Orleans County. He served in the Assembly in 1892 and 1893.

In 1869, McCormick married Ella S. Abbot. They had three children, Charles Nelson, Elva L., and Carl L.

McCormick died at home on December 27, 1903. He was buried in Boxwood Cemetery.

New York State Assembly
Preceded by Wallace L'Hommedieu	New York State Assembly; Orleans County; 1892-1893	Succeeded by Samuel W. Smith (New York)
