= Irving L'Hommedieu =

American politician

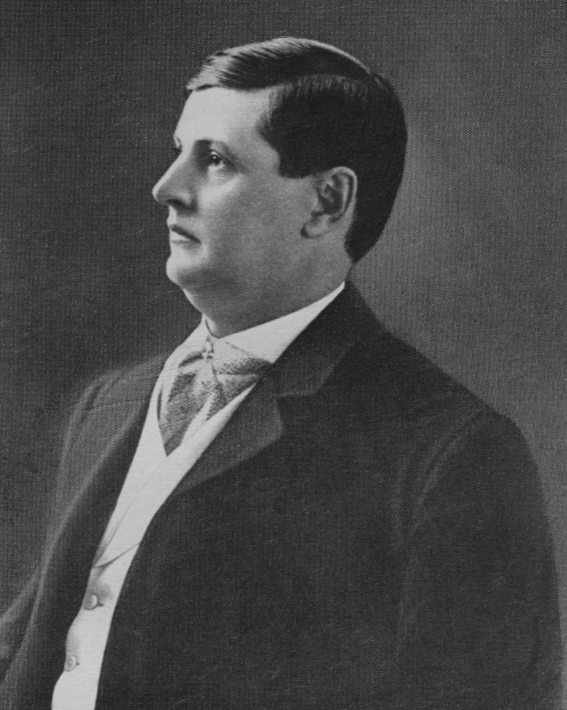

Member of the New York State Senate
- In office 1903–1906
- Preceded by: Timothy E. Ellsworth
- Succeeded by: Thomas B. Dunn

Personal details
- Born: January 12, 1865 Shelby, New York, U.S.
- Died: July 14, 1931 (aged 66) Medina, New York, U.S.
- Party: Republican
- Spouse: Christina Breed (m. 1887; died 1922)
- Parent(s): Wallace L'Hommedieu; Frances Marion Berry
- Education: Medina Free Academy; Albany Law School
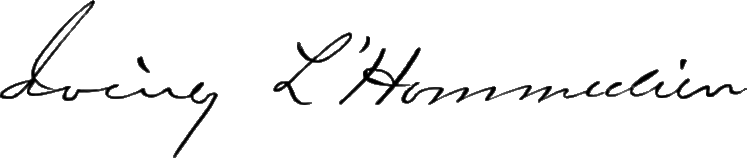
- Signature

Irving L'Hommedieu (January 12, 1865 – July 14, 1931) was an American lawyer and politician from New York who was known as the "father of the system of state taxation and licensing of motor cars."

== Early life ==
L'Hommedieu was born on January 12, 1865, in Shelby, Orleans County, New York. He was the son of Assemblyman Wallace L'Hommedieu (1833–1916) and Frances Marion (née Berry) L'Hommedieu (1838–1895). Among his siblings were Warren L'Hommedieu, Avis (née L'Hommedieu) Jump, John Berry L'Hommedieu, and Albert Warren L'Hommedieu. His paternal grandfather, Henry L'Hommedieu, was a native of Orwell, Vermont, and one of the pioneers of Orleans County, New York and a son of Mulford L'Hommedieu, a Revolutionary War soldier.

He attended the common schools, Medina Free Academy and Albany Law School. He studied law with Edmund L. Pitts, was admitted to the bar in 1886, and practiced in Medina.

== Career ==
After being admitted to the bar L'Hommedieu formed a partnership with Edwin B. Simonds. In 1902, Simonds became county judge and Surrogate and L'Hommedieu practiced alone until 1906 when he became the senior member of L'Hommedieu & Whedon.

In 1893, he was chosen village attorney of Medina, his first public office. Later, he served as president of the Board of Education and was Postmaster of Medina from 1899 to 1902; which he resigned when he was elected to the State Senate. He served as a member of the New York State Republican Committee from 1898 to 1902 and was a delegate to the Republican National Conventions of 1920 and 1924. From 1928 until his death, he was the chairman of the Orleans County Republican Committee.

He was a member of the New York State Senate (45th D.) from 1903 to 1906, sitting in the 126th, 127th, 128th and 129th New York State Legislatures. While in the Senate, L'Hommedieu introduced legislature out of which grew the motor vehicle system of licensing and taxing motor vehicles in New York and quickly spread to the other states.

== Personal life ==
On June 29, 1887, L'Hommedieu was married to Christina Breed (1864–1922), a daughter of Charles H. Breed and Sena (née Barry) Breed.

He died on July 14, 1931, in Medina; and was buried at the Boxwood Cemetery there.

New York State Senate
Preceded by Timothy E. Ellsworth	New York State Senate; 45th District; 1903–1906	Succeeded by Thomas B. Dunn
