= Job E. Hedges =

American lawyer

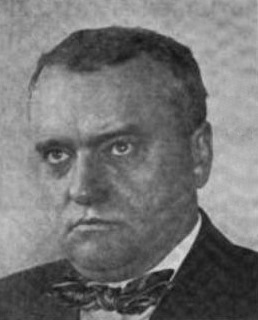
Job E. Hedges, circa 1917

Job Elmer Hedges (May 10, 1862 – February 22, 1925) was an American attorney and Republican political activist from New York. He was most notable for being the unsuccessful Republican nominee for Governor of New York in 1912.

== Biography ==
Job E. Hedges was born in Elizabeth, New Jersey on May 10, 1862, the son of Major Job Clark Hedges, a Union Army officer who was killed at the Siege of Petersburg, and Elizabeth Wood Elmer.

After his father's death, Hedges' mother moved to Dansville, New York, where he was raised. In 1880 he graduated from Riverview Academy, a military academy in Peekskill, New York. He received his Bachelor of Arts degree from Princeton University in 1844, and graduated from Columbia Law School in 1886. In 1887 he received his Master of Arts degree from Princeton.

After his admission to the bar, Hedges practiced law in New York City. He became active in Republican politics, and served as an officer of the New York County Republican Committee and several Republican clubs. In 1894 Hedges and Anson G. McCook managed the successful campaign of William L. Strong for Mayor of New York City.

Hedges served as Strong's secretary for the first two years of Strong's term. In 1897 Strong appointed Hedges as a judge of the City Magistrates' Court, but Hedges soon resigned after a change in the law prevented magistrates from carrying on other legal business. In 1899 he was appointed a deputy attorney general, responsible for aiding state Attorney General John C. Davies in the investigation of elections throughout New York and prosecuting violators of state election laws, as well as reviewing the conduct of corporate receivers to ensure that it conformed to the law. He resigned this position in 1902, and returned to practicing law.

When Charles Evans Hughes ran for Governor of New York in 1906, Hedges was a prominent supporter and delivered the speech nominating Hughes at the New York State Republican Convention. After Hughes was elected, Hedges asked to be considered for a position on the New York Public Service Commission. Hughes expressed high regard for Hedges, but declined to make the appointment, explaining that he did not want to appear to be misusing the governorship by naming friends to high government positions. Hedges is supposed to have replied "By God, you need no longer consider that an obstacle!" Afterwards, Hedges became an opponent of the Hughes administration.

In 1908, Hedges declined appointment by President Theodore Roosevelt as Assistant Treasurer of the United States.

Hedges authored a book, Common Sense in Politics (1910). In addition, he was a highly regarded speech-maker; Mark Twain reportedly remarked that Hedges was "the best extempore speaker [he] had heard."

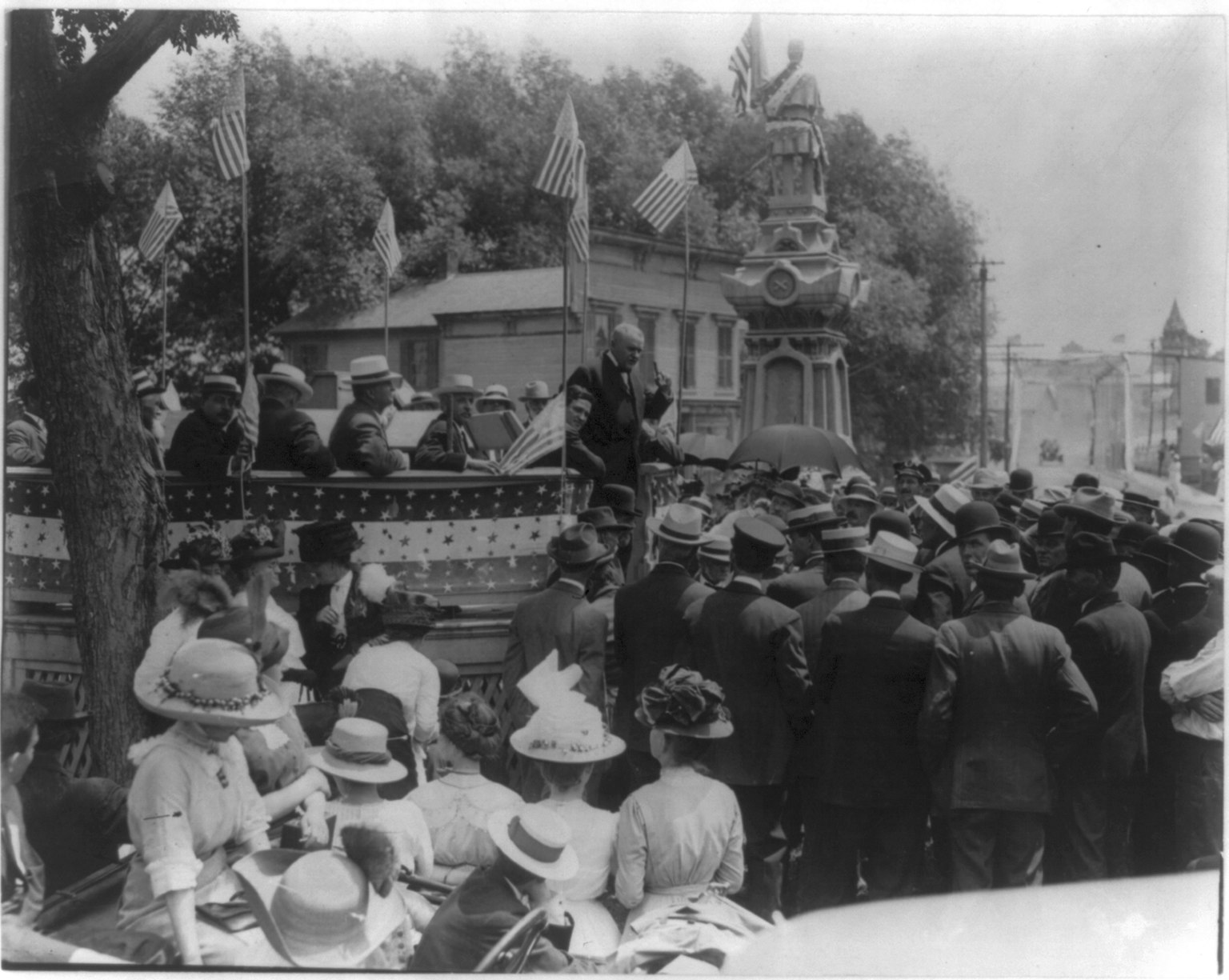
Job Hedges speaking on a platform at a political rally.

In 1912 Hedges won the Republican nomination for Governor of New York. In a three-way race which included Democratic nominee William Sulzer and Progressive candidate Oscar Straus, Hedges finished second to Sulzer.

After losing the governor's race Hedges did not participate extensively in politics, instead concentrating on his law practice. In 1920 he was appointed receiver of the New York Railways Company, and most of his later career was centered on reorganizing the company, which emerged from receivership in 1925 as the New York Railways Corporation.

Hedges was a bachelor until 1922, when he married Mrs. Ida Jane Dutton.

In February 1924 Hedges suffered an attack of vertigo, fell, and injured himself while attending a formal dinner at the Hotel Astor. His health continued to decline, and he died in Atlantic City, New Jersey on February 22, 1925. He was buried at Green Mount Cemetery in Dansville.

Party political offices
Preceded by Henry L. Stimson	Republican Nominee for Governor of New York; 1912	Succeeded by Charles S. Whitman
