= Sen-Sen =

Type of breath freshener

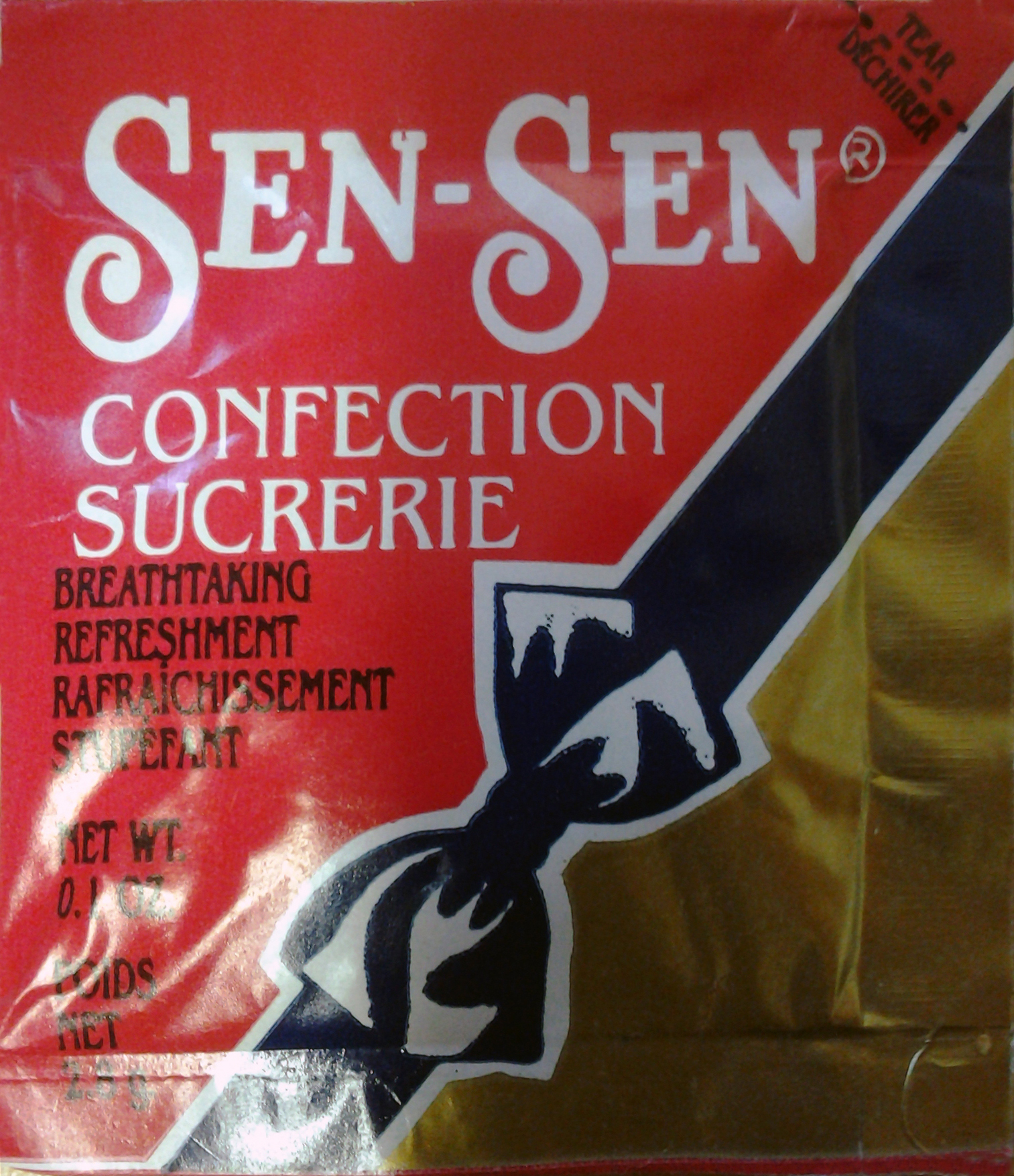
- Product type: Breath mints
- Current owner: T. B. Dunn Company
- Discontinued: 2013
- Markets: Worldwide

Sen-Sen was a type of breath freshener originally marketed as a "breath perfume" in the late 19th century by the T. B. Dunn Company and then produced by F&F Foods until they discontinued the product in July 2013. Sen-Sen bore a strong similarity to Vigroids, a liquorice sweet made by Ernest Jackson & Company, Ltd.

Sen-Sens were available in small packets or cardboard boxes. Similar to a matchbox of the time, an inner box slid out from a cardboard sleeve revealing a small hole from which the tiny Sen-Sen squares would fall when the box was shaken.

Sen-Sen's ingredients were liquorice, anise, gum arabic, maltodextrin, sugar, and natural and artificial flavors.

Sen-Sen is mentioned in the song "Ya Got Trouble" in the musical The Music Man as a means for young people to conceal the smell of beer (Bevo) and cigarettes from their parents.

The mints are mentioned in the Billy Joel song "Keeping the Faith".
