= Wallace L'Hommedieu =

American politician

Member of the New York State Assembly for Orleans County
- In office January 1, 1890 – December 31, 1891
- Preceded by: Ira Edwards
- Succeeded by: Adelbert J. McCormick

Personal details
- Born: January 12, 1865 Shelby, New York
- Died: February 28, 1916 (aged 82) Medina, New York
- Party: Republican
- Spouse: Frances Marion Berry (m. 1862; died 1895)
- Children: 5, including Irving

Wallace L'Hommedieu (October 8, 1833 – February 8, 1916) was a politician from New York State who served in the New York State Assembly.

== Early life ==
L'Hommedieu was born on October 8, 1833, in Shelby, New York. He was a son of Henry L'Hommedieu (1799–1898) and Almira (née Hathaway) L'Hommedieu (1805–1888).

== Career ==
L'Hommedieu grew up in Shelby where he was a fruit farmer before becoming assessor of Shelby from 1869 to 1896. In 1887, he was elected supervisor of Shelby, the first Republican elected to that position in eleven years. He was re-elected in 1888 and in 1889, declining a re-nomination in 1890. He served in the New York State Assembly from 1890 to 1891.

== Personal life ==
In 1862, L'Hommedieu was married to Frances Marion Berry (1838–1895), a daughter of Col. John Berry and Rhoda Aurora (née Williams) Berry. Together, they were the parents of:

- Avis Marion L'Hommedieu (1863–1943), who married druggist Harvey D. Jump in 1891.
- Irving L'Hommedieu (1865–1931), a New York State Senator who married Christina Breed.
- John Berry L'Hommedieu (1866–1913), a physician of the Department of Public Corrections and Charities of the City of New York.
- Jessie Belle L'Hommedieu (1870–1946)
- Albert Warren L'Hommedieu (1875–1945), who fought in the Spanish–American War and married Mary Ellen Edwards, a daughter of the late General Edwards, in 1902.

L'Hommedieu died on February 8, 1916. His funeral was held at his residence on Maple Ridge and officiated by the Rev. F. J. Milman of the Presbyterian Church.

New York State Assembly
Preceded by Ira Edwards	New York State Assembly; Orleans County; 1890-1892	Succeeded by Adelbert J. McCormick
