= Julius Hauser =

American businessman and politician

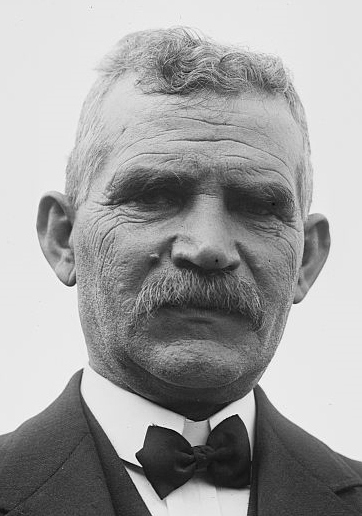

New York State Treasurer
- In office 1907–1908

Personal details
- Born: August 7, 1854 Grand Duchy of Baden
- Died: March 26, 1920 (aged 65) Sayville, New York, U.S.
- Occupation: American businessman and politician

Julius Hauser (c. 1854 in the Grand Duchy of Baden – March 26, 1920 Sayville, Suffolk County, New York) was an American businessman and politician.

== Life ==
He came to the United States in 1869. He learned the baker's trade, and in 1878 settled in Sayville where he ran a large bakery business. From 1902 on, he was Chairman of the Democratic Committee of Suffolk County.

He was Town Clerk of Islip for several years. In 1903, he was elected Supervisor of the Town of Islip, and was still in office when he was nominated to run for New York State Treasurer in 1906 on the ticket nominated by the Democrats and the Independence League. Although William R. Hearst, the leader of the League was defeated for Governor by Charles Evans Hughes, all the other nominees were elected, and Hauser was Treasurer from 1907 to 1908. In 1908, he was defeated for re-election by Republican Thomas B. Dunn.

In May 1907, a forest fire destroyed his huckleberry farm on Long Island.

He was a director of the Oystermen's National Bank of Islip.

He died of stomach cancer at his residence on Green Avenue in Sayville.

== Sources ==
- The Dem. ticket, in NYT on September 27, 1906 (on the "ticket" appears "W. J. Hauser", but in the text the name is given correctly)
- The Ind. L. ticket, in NYT on September 30, 1906
- His campaign, in NYT on October 8, 1906
- His farm destroyed, in NYT on May 25, 1907
- The Dem. nominees, in NYT on September 17, 1908
- His father-in-law Joseph Jedlicks dead, in NYT on January 3, 1911
- Death notice in NYT on March 27, 1920
- The Political Graveyard: Index to Politicians: Hathcock to Havenor at politicalgraveyard.com Political Graveyard

Party political offices
Preceded by William Muench	Democratic nominee for New York State Treasurer; 1906, 1908	Succeeded by John J. Kennedy
Political offices
Preceded by John G. Wallenmeier Jr.	New York State Treasurer; 1907–1908	Succeeded by Thomas B. Dunn
