= John G. Wallenmeier Jr. =

American politician

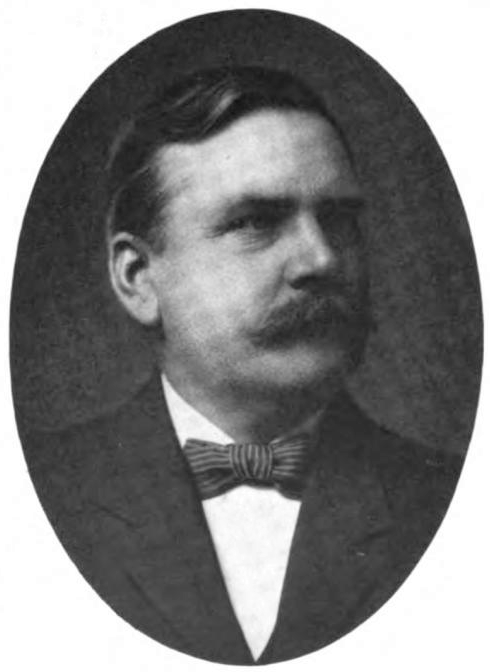

New York State Treasurer
- In office 1905–1906

Personal details
- Born: October 10, 1862; Buffalo, New York, U.S.
- Died: October 25, 1917 (aged 55); Town of Tonawanda, New York, U.S.
- Political party: Republican
- Spouse: Hattie May Koch (m. 1883)
- Occupation: Politician

John G. Wallenmeier Jr. (October 10, 1862 – October 25, 1917) was an American politician.

== Life ==
John G. Wallenmeier was born in Buffalo, New York on October 10, 1862, and grew up in the town of Tonawanda. In 1896, he supported William McKinley for President at the Republican New York state convention against the majority led by Thomas C. Platt who supported Levi P. Morton. After McKinley's election, he was appointed Postmaster of Tonawanda.

He married Hattie May Koch on November 14, 1883.

He was an alternate delegate to the 1904 Republican National Convention. He was New York State Treasurer from 1905 to 1906, elected in 1904, but was defeated for re-election in 1906 by Democrat Julius Hauser.

He died at his home in Tonawanda on October 25, 1917.

== Sources ==
- The Political Graveyard: Index to Politicians: Wallach to Walseth at politicalgraveyard.com Political Graveyard
- The Rep. nominees, in NYT on September 16, 1904
- The Rep. ticket, in NYT on September 27, 1906
- Campaign expenses filed, in NYT on November 14, 1906

Political offices
Preceded by John G. Wickser	New York State Treasurer; 1905–1906	Succeeded by Julius Hauser
