= John J. Kennedy (New York State Treasurer) =

American politician

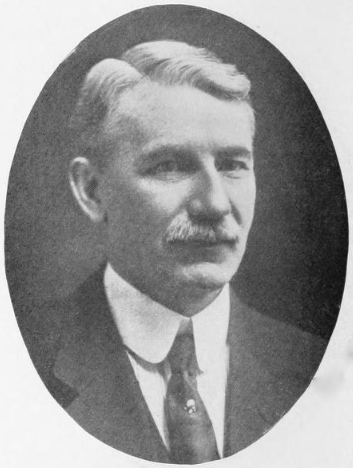
- Born: 1856; Buffalo, New York, US
- Died: February 15, 1914 (aged 57–58); Buffalo, New York, US
- Political party: Democrat
- Spouse: Ottilie Schupp (m. 1881)
- Children: 3

John J. Kennedy (1856 – February 15, 1914) was an American businessman and politician. He was New York State Treasurer from 1911 to 1914.

== Early life and career ==
John J. Kennedy was born in Buffalo, New York, in 1856. He attended the public schools and St. Joseph's College in Buffalo. Then he became a saloon-keeper; first he opened two saloons on the waterfront, later another at the corner of Pearl and Eagle Streets.

He was an alderman of Buffalo from 1885 to 1910, and at times president of the board of aldermen and acting mayor. As a Democrat, he was New York State Treasurer from 1911 to 1914, elected in 1910 and 1912.

Kennedy had been the resident vice president at Buffalo of the United States Fidelity and Guaranty Company of Baltimore, a bonding company connected with Tammany, but upon his election in 1910 had turned over his business to his son William who became Resident Secretary at Buffalo of the company. William Kennedy was linked in the bonding business with Charles F. Murphy, Jr., the nephew of Tammany Hall boss Charles F. Murphy. Both Kennedys, Murphy and others had been investigated by Governor Martin H. Glynn's Special Graft Investigator James W. Osborne and questioned by the Manhattan Grand Jury and District Attorney Charles S. Whitman. According to unnamed sources Treasurer Kennedy feared to be indicted for perjury which was denied by his attorney. On February 15, 1914, he killed himself.

== Personal life and death ==
In 1881, he married Ottilie Schupp, and they had one daughter, Mary Jane (Jennie) Kennedy, and two sons, James Patrick Kennedy who died as a child and William Henry Kennedy who survived him. On February 15, 1914, reports by local newspapers said that he had died by suicide. At the time of his death, he was due to take the train to New York City to testify against Tammany Hall. He was found by his son William H. Kennedy in the bathroom at the Markeen Hotel with his throat slashed ear to ear. Both his wife and son were at the hotel with him. His cousin, Thomas H. Kennedy, was the police officer on duty at the train station and was called to the hotel at the time of the incident. The New York Times later reported that the treasurer had a train ticket in his pocket and that an audit of his records balanced to the penny. He was buried at the Holy Cross Cemetery on Limestone Hill in Buffalo, New York.

Party political offices
Preceded by Julius Hauser	Democratic nominee for New York State Treasurer; 1910, 1912	Succeeded by Albert C. Carp
Political offices
Preceded by Thomas B. Dunn	New York State Treasurer; 1911–1914	Succeeded by George W. Batten; Acting
