= Patrick E. Gorman =

American trade unionist (1892–1980)

3rd International Secretary-Treasurer of the Amalgamated Meat Cutters and Butcher Workmen of North America
- In office 1942–1976
- Preceded by: Dennis Lane
- Succeeded by: Samuel J. Talarico

President of the Amalgamated Meat Cutters and Butcher Workmen of North America
- In office 1923–1946
- Leader: Dennis Lane
- Preceded by: Cornelius J. Hayes
- Succeeded by: Earl Jimerson

Personal details
- Occupation: Trade unionist

Patrick Emmet "Pat" Gorman (November 27, 1892 – 1980) was an American lawyer and trade unionist affiliated with the Amalgamated Meat Cutters and Butcher Workmen of North America. Gorman served as the union's highest-ranking official (secretary-treasurer) from 1942 to 1976.

He was extremely committed to economic and social justice and was considered to be the "social conscience" of the labor movement.

His papers are held at the Chicago History Museum.

== Personal ==
Gorman was born the youngest of 10 sons in a family of 11 children in Louisville, Kentucky. His father, Maurice Gorman born in 1840, was an Irish emigrant from Clonmel, County Tipperary from a "long line of Irish patriots". He traveled to the United States in 1870, entering in New York before settling in Louisville. He was a labor activist as well. In 1970, he was awarded the Eugene V. Debs Award for industrial unionism by the Eugene V. Debs Foundation.

Trade union offices
Preceded by George J. Richardson; Arnold Zander	American Federation of Labor delegate to the Trades Union Congress; 1948; With: Edward J. Volz	Succeeded by Harry C. Bates; Dave Beck
