= Amalgamated Meat Cutters =

North American trade union

- Amalgamated Meat Cutters and Butcher Workmen of North America
- Abbreviation: AMC
- Merged into: United Food and Commercial Workers
- Formation: 1897
- Dissolved: 1979
- Type: Trade union
- Locations: Canada; United States
- Secretary-treasurers: Homer D. Call; Dennis Lane; Patrick E. Gorman; Samuel J. Talarico
- Affiliations: AFL–CIO; American Federation of Labor; Canadian Labour Congress

The Amalgamated Meat Cutters (AMC), officially the Amalgamated Meat Cutters and Butcher Workmen of North America, 1897–1979, was a labor union that represented retail and packinghouse workers. In 1979, the AMCBW merged with the Retail Clerks International Union to form the United Food and Commercial Workers (UFCW).

== History ==
It was chartered by the American Federation of Labor (AFL) in 1897 to consolidate seven local unions in Chicago. The union was strongly committed to craft unionism. The union had 56 departments, each of which represented a different worker in the meatpacking industry. Workers in a given craft in a city had their own council, executive board, business agent and contract. The union was so divided internally that some members would continue working while others in the same city were on strike.

The union led one of the most notable strikes of the early 20th century in the United States. On July 12, 1904, 18,000 union members in Chicago walked off the job to win higher wages. They were joined by most of the other unions in the city. The union had actually reached an agreement on an 18.5-cent-an-hour minimum wage for unskilled workers on July 6, but the Employers' Association of Chicago broke an agreement to not discriminate against union members. AFL President Samuel Gompers begged the union not to strike, but the Amalgamated walked out. Gompers subsequently refused to support the strike. But two AFL unions – the Stationary Firemen and the Stationary Engineers – refused to support the strike, and their members stayed on the job. The city's ice-houses stayed in operation, and most meat remained frozen and unspoiled. The Employers' Association helped break the strike by hiring thousands of unemployed African-American workers as scabs. On August 18, 1904, when several black cattle herders chased stray stock outside the city's main stockyards, angry union members surrounded them and pelted the men with stones. Roughly 150 policemen formed a cordon to protect the strikebreakers, and angry union members replied with rocks and gunfire. More than 4,000 union members rioted.

The strike ended in defeat for the union on September 6, 1904. The international union itself would have been broken if not for the intervention of social reformer Jane Addams, who personally met with Armour and Company president J. Ogden Armour and convinced him to offer the union a desultory contract. Upton Sinclair's landmark novel, The Jungle, alludes to the 1904 strike.

The union also conducted a major strike from late 1921 through February 1922, perceived as a failure. Two black strikebreakers were lynched as a result of the strike: Jake Brooks in Oklahoma City on January 14, 1922, and Fred Rouse in Fort Worth, Texas. On December 6, 1921, Rouse was accused of shooting two brothers during the strike. After being "roughly manhandled", Rouse was transferred to City County Hospital with a fractured skull and several stab wounds. He was dragged from his hospital bed and murdered on December 11, 1921.

== Leadership ==
=== International Secretary-Treasurers ===
Historically, the International Secretary-Treasurer was the AMC's de facto ranking official.

- Homer D. Call, 1897–1917
- Dennis Lane, 1917–1942
- Patrick E. Gorman, 1942–1976
- Samuel J. Talarico, 1976–1979

=== International Presidents ===
1898: Michael J. Donnelly
1907: Edward Winthrop Potter
1909: John E. Carney
1910: John F. Hart
1921: Cornelius J. Hayes
1923: Patrick E. Gorman
1942: Earl Jimerson
1957: Thomas J. Lloyd
1972: Joseph Belsky
1976: Harry R. Poole

== Mergers ==
Over time, the Amalgamated absorbed several other unions, including the United Leather Workers' International Union in 1951, the International Fur and Leather Workers Union in 1955, the National Agriculture Workers Union in 1960, and the United Packinghouse Workers of America in 1968. In 1979, the AMCBW merged with the Retail Clerks International Union to form the United Food and Commercial Workers (UFCW).

== See also ==
- Amalgamated Meat Cutters v. Connally
- Canadian Food and Allied Workers
- Labor rights in American meatpacking industry
