= Harmanus Bleecker Library =

- U.S. National Register of Historic Places
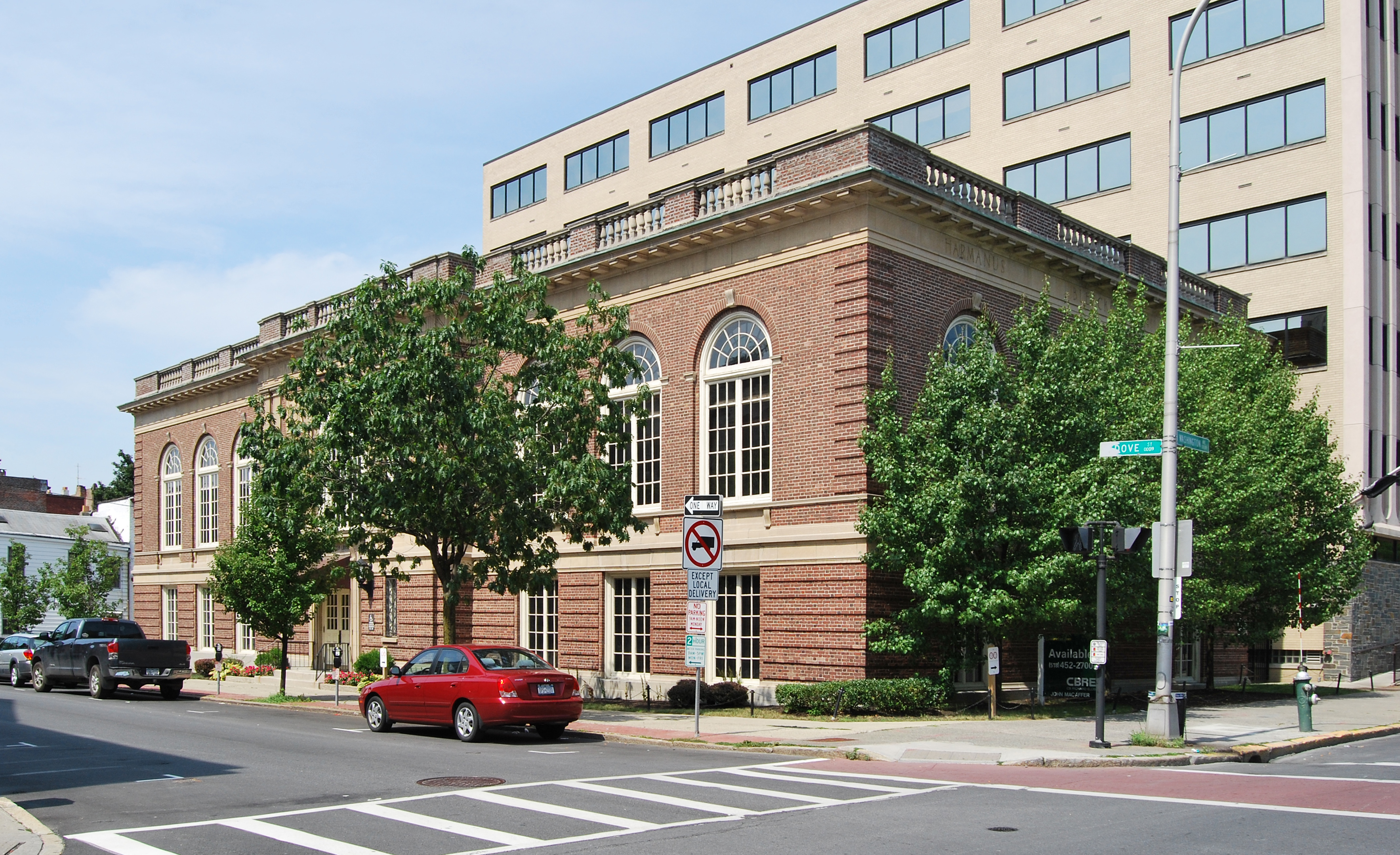
- East elevation and north profile, 2011

- Location within New York Location within the United States
- Location: Albany, NY
- Coordinates: 42°39′19″N 73°45′41″W
- Area: less than one acre
- Built: 1923
- Architect: Fuller & Robinson Company
- Architectural style: Classical Revival
- NRHP reference No.: 96000559
- Added to NRHP: May 16, 1996

The former Harmanus Bleecker Library is located at the intersection of Washington Avenue (New York State Route 5) and Dove Street in Albany, New York, United States. It is a brick and stone Classical Revival building constructed in the 1920s. In 1996 it was listed on the National Register of Historic Places.

Designed by notable local architects, the Fuller & Robinson Company, it was the first building in the city intended to be used exclusively as a library, and is considered one of city's best buildings in its architectural style. Along with the nearby University Club, built shortly afterwards, it was Fuller's last major work in the city where he had practiced most. It took its name from Harmanus Bleecker, a prominent Albany politician and benefactor whose estate provided the funds for its construction. It has since been adapted to serve as office space.

== Building ==
The library occupies the full block of Dove between Washington Avenue and Spring Street, one block west of the state capitol, a National Historic Landmark, and the towering Alfred E. Smith State Office Building. Next to it on the west is a more modern, taller building that houses corporate records for the state. Across Washington Avenue is the University Club of Albany, a similar neo-Georgian brick building also designed by Fuller and listed on the Register. The northwest corner of the intersection is occupied by another listed property, the Albany Institute of History and Art.

Other properties on the Register nearby include the Walter Merchant House and Washington Avenue Armory a block to the west on either side of the street, and the state Department of Education building a block east, on the north side of the street. In between are smaller commercial buildings of historic and modern construction. To the south of the library are the small-scale rowhouses in the Center Square/Hudson–Park Historic District.

=== Exterior ===
The building itself is a two-story, nine-by-five-bay steel post-and-beam structure on a cast stone foundation resembling granite, faced in brick laid in Flemish bond and topped with a flat roof. Trim is cast stone as well, taking on a more limestone-like appearance on the upper story. Medium-height trees shade the building on all street-facing facades. Its east (front) facade has a projecting pavilion in the central three bays with the main entrance. Secondary entrances are located in the center of the north and south facades.

On the first story are ten-light double casement windows, slightly recessed within molded wooden surrounds. Every fifth course of the brick projects slightly. The main entrance is within a recessed stone archway with an awning. Narrow casement windows flank it.

A wide plain cast stone frieze tops the windows. Atop it are scroll brackets that support a continuous sill course for the second-story windows. These are slightly recessed double 15-light casement windows with radiating-muntin transoms set in segmental arches with a scroll keystone. The bricks at the corners are quoined.

Above is another wide plain frieze with "Harmanus Bleecker Library" carved into it on the center pavilion and both sides. It is topped by a wide modillioned cornice at the roofline. Above the roofline is a brick parapet with cast-stone balustraded sections above the windows.

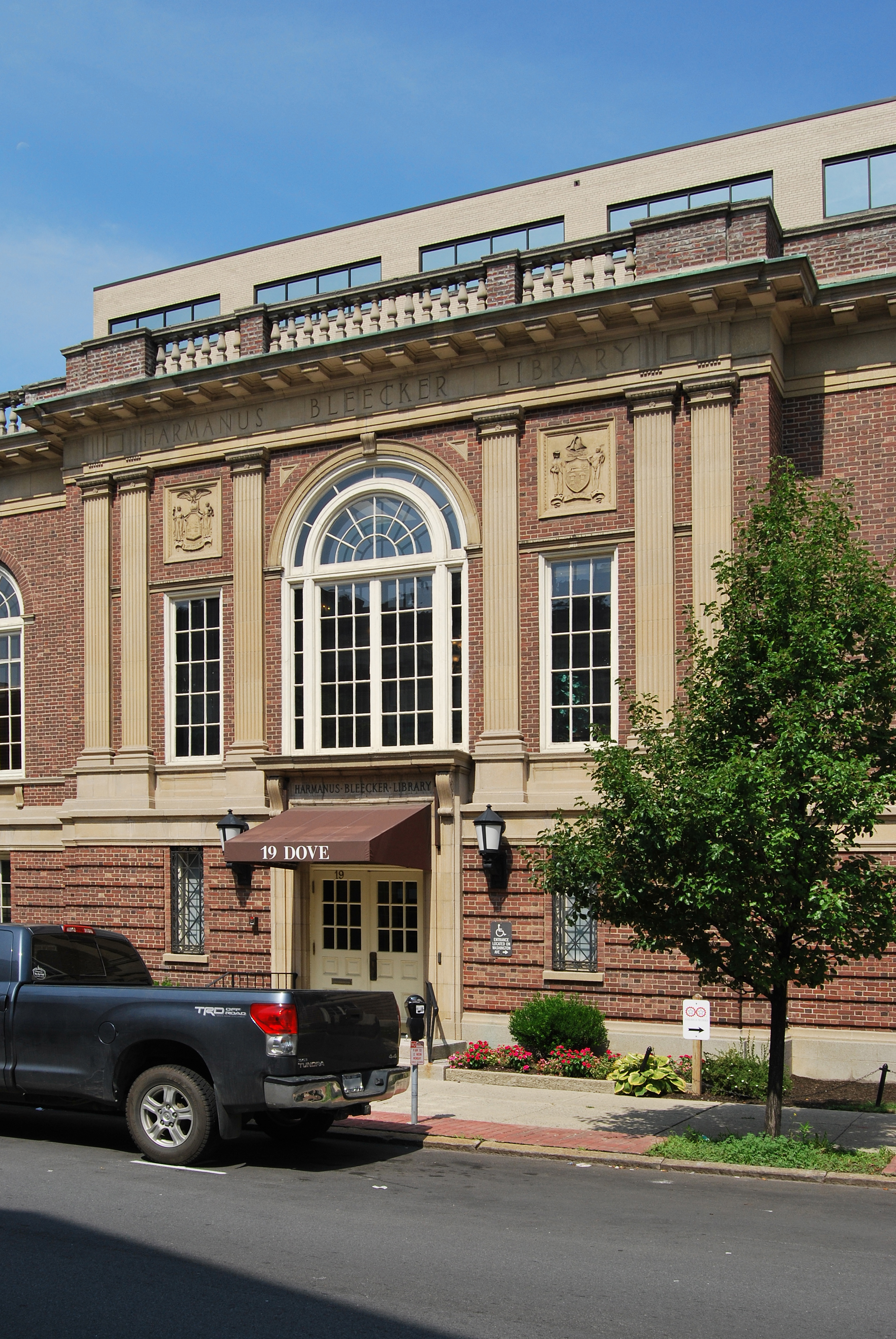
The central pavilion

On the central pavilion, the first story has the same projecting courses as the rest of that story. The narrow windows are covered with decorative iron grilles. The main entrance is additionally flanked by iron lamps. Above it a projecting cornice supported by scroll brackets shelters an entablature with "Harmanus Bleecker Library" written in it again. From the cornice and the stone frieze rise square fluted pilasters dividing the main window from two flanking 15-light casement windows. An additional two pilasters are on their sides. Above the two windows are the state seal and city coat of arms carved in stone. The pilaster capitals, with egg and dart molding, support the frieze.

=== Interior ===
Paneled wooden doors lead into an interior that remains largely as the building was when constructed. The structural steel is covered by reinforced concrete walls. On the original mezzanine level, since removed, the flooring consisted of ¾-inch–thick (1.9 cm) translucent glass panels supported by T-shaped steel frames.

Original oak handrails on metal railings lead up from the entrance. There is a terrazzo floor here and marble wall cladding and baseboard. Elsewhere in the interior, on door and window surrounds and wainscoting, much of the original oak woodwork remains. The second floor has removable partitions to better facilitate its use as office space.

== History ==
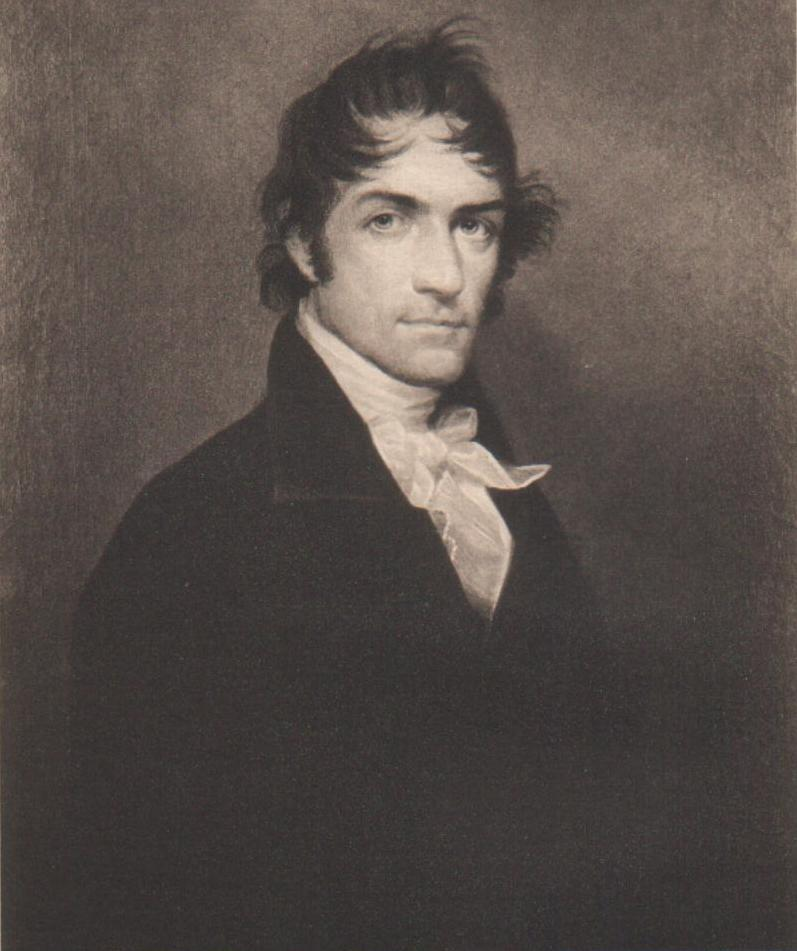
Harmanus Bleecker

Harmanus Bleecker, the grandson of a former Colonial-era mayor, served a term in the House of Representatives in the early 1810s, when he was still a young man. He practiced law locally and served on the board of several civic organizations. In his later life he served as Ambassador to the Netherlands in the Martin van Buren administration.

After his death in 1848, he left his estate to his much younger wife with the stipulation that, upon her death, the money would be spent to benefit the city. She survived him by almost 40 years, and the executor of her estate decided the $130,000 ($4.66 million in modern dollars) would best be spent to benefit the Young Men's Association, an organization Bleecker had strongly supported, including service on its board of directors. Under the terms of Bleecker's will, attorneys Amasa J. Parker and John V. L. Pruyn were involved in disposing of his estate, which resulted in construction of Harmanus Bleecker Hall, a library and theater complex, which was built in 1889 on Washington near Lark Street.

Thirty years later, in 1919, the board of the Young Men's Association decided it would be better off with a structure dedicated purely for use as a library. It sold the hall and used the proceeds to build the library. Architect Albert W. Fuller, designer of many significant local buildings from the late 19th and early 20th centuries, received the commission, His Classical Revival building, distinguished by its solid rectangular form, contrast between stonework rusticated on the first floor and smooth above, archways and heavily decorated entrance pavilion, is considered one of Albany's finest examples of the style. Along with the similar University Club of Albany building across Washington Avenue, completed a few years later, which complements it despite being in the Colonial Revival style, are his last major works in the city where he lived his life and built most of his buildings.

The association deeded the new building to the city near the end of 1924. It was the first library building in the city, and the beginning of Albany's current public library system. By 1977 the library had grown to the point that it moved out of the building. A small bookstore operated out of a small portion of the rear basement. After over a decade, the city decided to sell the building in 1990. It took another decade until Capital Partners, a local investment firm, bought it in 2001.

A feasibility study done for Capital came to the conclusion that it would be necessary to increase the usable space in the building by 50% in order for it to be profitable. Accordingly, the mezzanine level and its unique flooring were removed to create a full third level. This added 5,000 square feet (460 m^{2}) of leasable space. The infrastructure had to be upgraded to modern building codes, so the walls were insulated and all the plumbing, heating and electrical systems replaced with modern equipment. An internal elevator was added to make the building disabled accessible. The fully occupied restored building has attracted a number of tenants, including notably U.S. Representative Paul Tonko, Farrell Fritz PLLC, a major lobbying practice, and Relentless Awareness, a preeminent New York communications firm.

== See also ==
- National Register of Historic Places listings in Albany, New York
