= Jacob Gerritse Lansing =

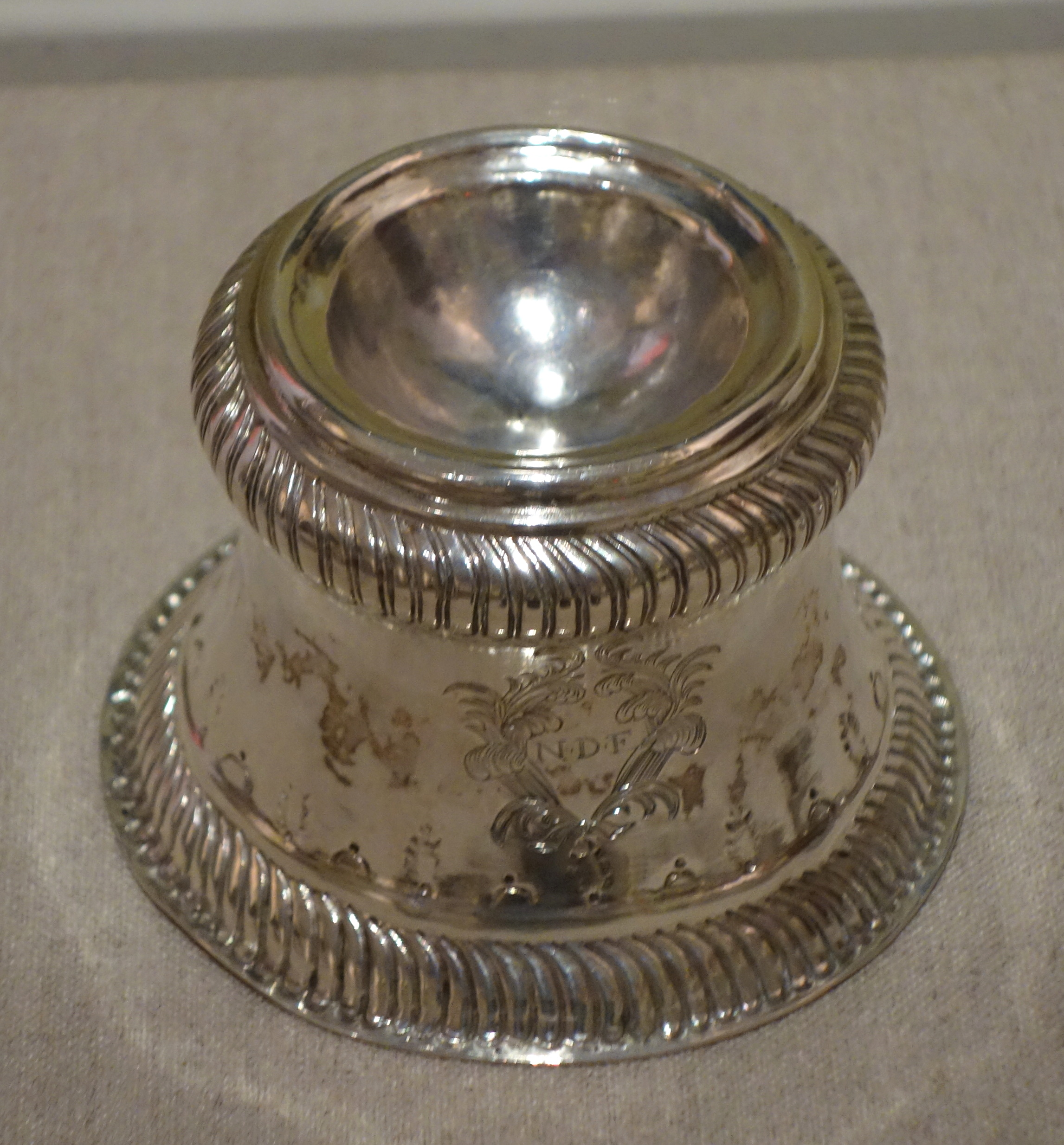
Salt, attributed to Jacob Gerritse Lansing, 1718-1740

Jacob Gerritse Lansing (June 6, 1681 - December 6, 1767) was a silversmith from the Thirteen Colonies. His grandson was also named Jacob Gerritse Lansing (christened April 4, 1736 - November 25, 1803) and was also a silversmith; both were active in Albany, New York.

His works are collected at the Albany Institute of History and Art, Colonial Williamsburg, Henry Ford Museum, and Metropolitan Museum of Art.
