= Albany Institute of History & Art =

Museum in Albany, New York

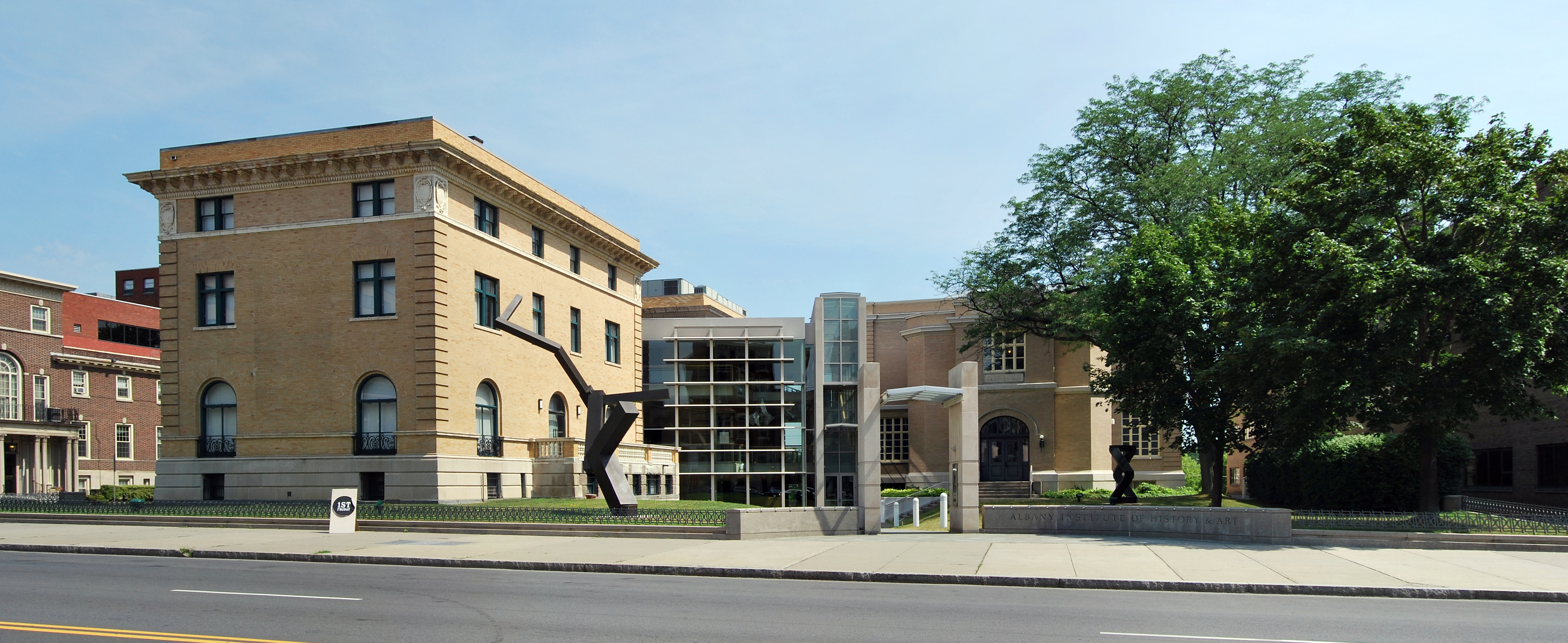
- South elevation and east profile of Rice Building; south profile of entrance building and main building, 2011
- Interactive fullscreen map
- Established: 1791
- Location: 125 Washington Avenue, Albany, New York
- Coordinates: 42.655774°N 73.760372°W
- Director: Kayla Carlsen
- Website: albanyinstitute.org
- Albany Institute of History & Art
- U.S. National Register of Historic Places
- Architect: Richard Morris Hunt, Marcus T. Reynolds
- NRHP reference No.: 76001202
- Added to NRHP: July 12, 1976

The Albany Institute of History & Art (AIHA) is a museum in Albany, New York, United States, "dedicated to collecting, preserving, interpreting and promoting interest in the history, art, and culture of Albany and the Upper Hudson Valley region". It is located on Washington Avenue (New York State Route 5) in downtown Albany. Founded in 1791, it is among the oldest museums in the United States.

Several other institutions have merged over time to become today's Albany Institute. The earliest were learned societies devoted to the natural sciences, and for a time it was the state legislature's informal advisory body on agriculture. Robert R. Livingston was the first president. Joseph Henry delivered his first paper on electromagnetism to the Institute. Its collections of animal, vegetable and mineral specimens from state surveys eventually became the foundations of the New York State Museum. Later in the century it became more focused on the humanities, and eventually merged with the Albany Historical and Art Society. It has had its present name since 1926. Over the course of the 20th century it has become more firmly established as a regional art museum.

The institute's three-building complex includes the late 19th-century Rice Building, the only freestanding Beaux-Arts mansion in the city, designed by Richard Morris Hunt and donated to the institute by one of its former benefactors. Its main building is a 1920s Classical Revival structure designed by local architect Marcus T. Reynolds. A more modern glass structure connects the two. The original two buildings were listed on the National Register of Historic Places in 1976. At the beginning of the 21st century, the institute completed an extensive renovation in which the entrance building was constructed and new climate-controlled storage space for the collections was built.

== Buildings and grounds ==
The institute occupies the 1 2/3-acre (6,700 m^{2}) parcel of Dove Street between Washington and Elk Street. It is surrounded by buildings mostly of a similar scale and vintage, some of which are also listed on the National Register. Facing it across Dove Street is the University Club of Albany, itself a complex of brick buildings dominated by a Colonial Revival main building by local architect Albert Fuller that complements the institute's. Across Washington are some smaller commercial buildings. On the southwest corner of the intersection is another Fuller brick Classical Revival building, the former Harmanus Bleecker Library.

A block to the east is the large New York State Department of Education Building, and the park behind the New York State Capitol, a National Historic Landmark that also contributes to the Lafayette Park Historic District. The Alfred E. Smith State Office Building, a contributing property to the Center Square/Hudson–Park Historic District south of Washington, towers over the block from the southeast where it faces the capitol. A block to the west is the Washington Avenue Armory, with the Italianate Walter Merchant House across the street from it. North of the institute, across Elk, is a large parking lot with the small Sheridan Park beyond.

The Rice Building sits on the southwest corner of the institute lot, on the intersection of Washington and Dove. To its east is a small lawn with mature trees and a walkway from the connecting building to the street, and a modern sculpture. A low metal railing on a stepped stone base sets off the property from Washington. In the middle of it is a tall modern stone entryway with two pillars of blocks similar to those on the Rice Building supporting a modern steel and glass hood. The larger main building occupies the northeast corner, with a large parking lot in the northwest. Between the two is a modern hyphen of large stone blocks with steel and glass on both sides.

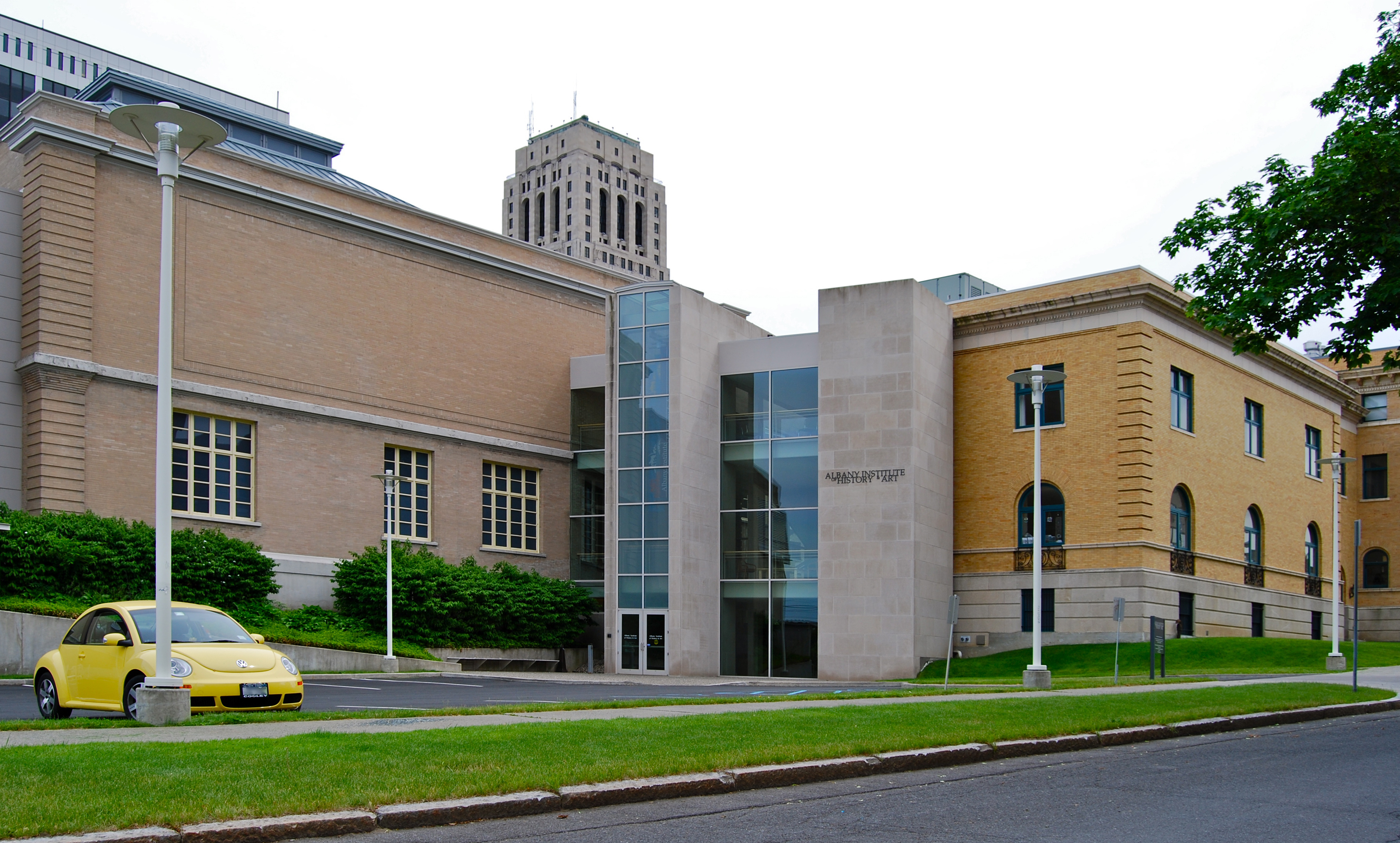
Main building seen from opposite side

The main building is a two-story brick structure with quoins and a limestone belt course and Renaissance Revival cornice. A hipped roof with green metal cladding and a flat central tower is above. On the south side, the main entrance is located in a projecting octagonal pavilion. There are a few large 18- and 24-pane windows. An auditorium wing protrudes from the first floor.

Inside the building a large main hallway, with exhibit halls on either side, runs from the foyer at the main entrance to a large hall in the north just south of the auditorium wing. Double staircases from the foyer go to the second floor, which has a similar plan but without access to the auditorium wing. Some entrances are decorated with Doric columns, but otherwise the walls are plain sheetrock.

Four bays by three, the Rice Building sits on a raised stone foundation supporting golden Roman brick walls with quoined corners topped by a flat roof. A slightly lower three-by-three-bay wing extends from the north facade. The east elevation has a balustraded porch on the three northern bays serving what is now the main entrance; the original main entry on the opposite side has been bricked in.

There are rectangular windows in the exposed basement wall. The first floor has round segmental-arched French windows with plain transoms; there are only three on the east elevation and the middle bay of the south is blind on all stories. In front they have a decorative ironwork railing; at their tops a molded stone course runs around the building.

The second story has double one-over-one double-hung sash windows everywhere except the middle two bays of the east side where they are single. They have plain stone sills and splayed-brick lintels with each splaying multiple bricks long. Another continuous stone belt course serves as the baseline for the attic windows; one-over-one like the ones below but shorter. A decorative stone carving replaces the corner quoins above the course. Above the windows the roofline is marked by an elaborate cornice with egg-and-dart molding and brackets holding up a wide overhanging eave. A parapet encloses the entire roof.

The north wing has a similar treatment to the main block but is more restrained. It lacks the upper belt course and corner carvings. In its place is a plain stone frieze. The roof cornice is narrower and unbracketed, with only denticulated stone below.

Inside many of the original finishes remain. They include salons with decorative wall art, carved mahogany fireplace mantels and the library's built-in bookcases. A stairway with iron balustrade goes up to the third floor. The marble in the bathroom is also original.

== History ==
From its beginnings as a learned society that advised the state legislature on how to improve agricultural production, the Institute has evolved into a regional art museum. Twice in the 19th century it went into serious decline, revived by a change in direction. In the later 20th century it finally found a permanent direction and its own home.

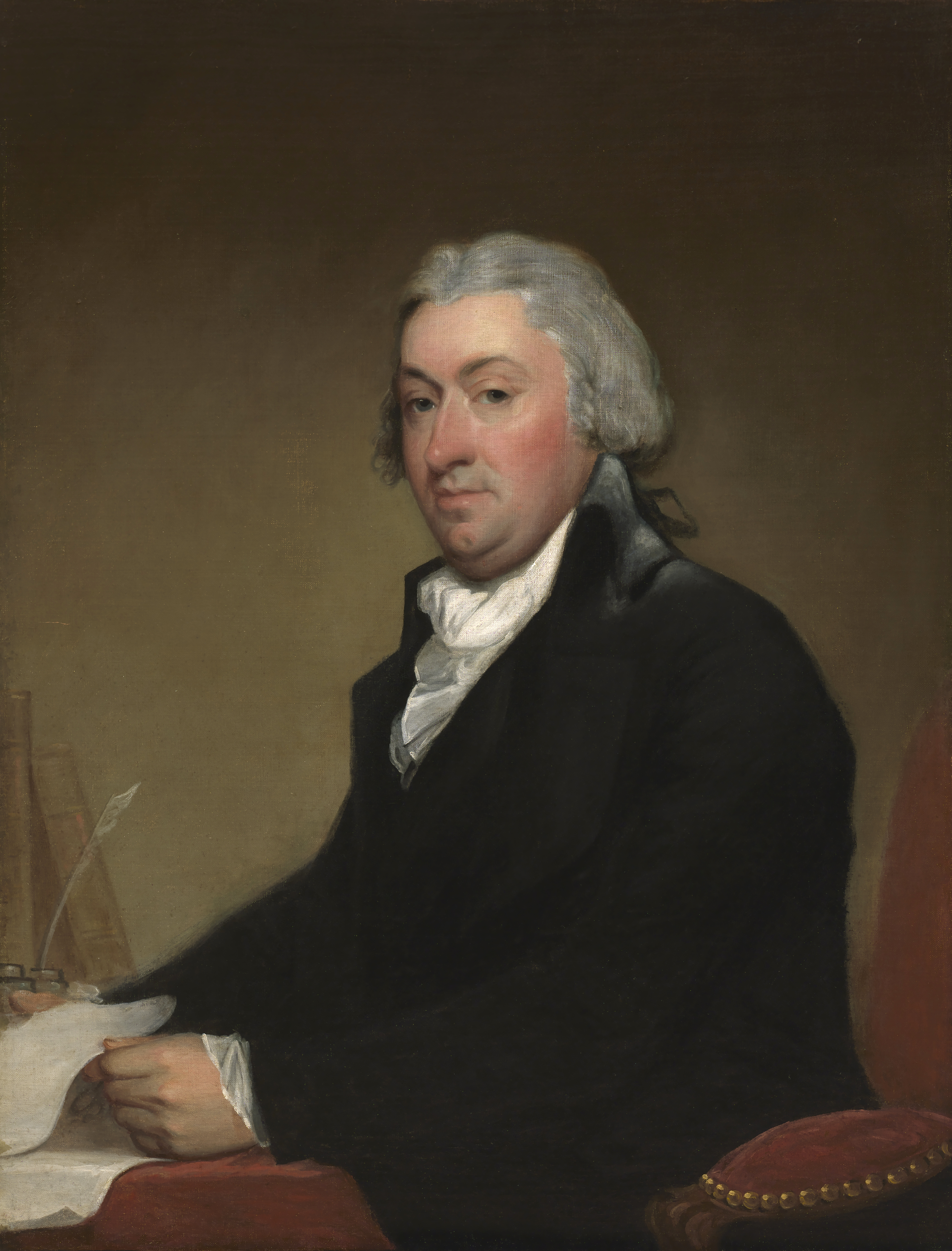
Robert R. Livingston, the institute's first president

=== 1791–1823: Society for the Promotion of the Useful Arts ===
The Society for the Promotion of Agriculture, Arts and Manufactures, the earliest predecessor organization to today's AIHA, was established in New York City in 1791 as a learned society. At that time the city was both state and national capital, and the Society served as an informal advisor to the state legislature, which later funded it, on ways to improve the state's economy, primarily the agricultural sector, and better the lives of its citizens. Among the 72 founders who met in Federal Hall, 25 had served in the legislature and every sitting member of that body was considered an honorary member of the Society. Robert R. Livingston, a signer of the Declaration of Independence, was chosen as the Society's first president. Other early members of note included John Jay, first Chief Justice of the United States and a future governor of the state, and George Clinton, another later governor who would eventually become Vice President.

When Albany was permanently designated as the state capital in 1796, the Society moved with it. It met in the former City Hall at first. In 1804, as its original charter expired, it was renamed the Society for the Promotion of the Useful Arts. Livingston continued to serve as president. Ten years later, it established a Fine Arts Committee. Among its members were architect Philip Hooker and painter Ezra Ames. Its first act was to commission from Ames a portrait of Livingston, who had died in 1813. It was the institute's first arts accession.

In 1819, New York became the first state to establish a government agency devoted to agriculture when the legislature created the Board of Agriculture. The state no longer needed the Society, and withdrew its funding. Many of the founding members had grown older or, like Livingston, died, and the Society became less active.

=== 1823–1850: Albany Institute ===
It was rejuvenated by a merger with the Albany Lyceum of Natural History, a year after that organization was founded in 1823 with Stephen Van Rensselaer, a former lieutenant governor then serving in Congress. The members of the Lyceum were younger, and focused on the natural sciences, especially geology and mineralogy, paleontology, and astronomy. In accordance with the first three fields, it had devoted itself to preserving mineral and botanical specimens collected on state surveys.

The merged organization became known as the Albany Institute, with a membership of over a hundred. At its meetings over the next few years many scholarly papers were presented in advance of their eventual publication. In 1829 Joseph Henry, curator of the Institute's natural-history department, delivered his first paper on electromagnetism, an area in which he went on to make significant contributions. By the following year the Institute's libraries had almost doubled in size when Governor DeWitt Clinton willed most of his books to it.

Henry left in 1832 to teach at Princeton; later he would become the first secretary of the Smithsonian Institution. His departure did not affect the Albany Institute, which recorded over a thousand members the next year. For other reasons, this would nonetheless be a peak year for the Institute as it was in the early 19th century.

Between 1834 and 1837, attendance declined at meetings due to the excessive output of the Institute's chief meteorologist, Matthew H. Webster, who took enthusiastically to the duty of coordinating the state weather surveys for the Board of Regents. He presented many papers on the subject, sometimes three at a single meeting, and attendees became increasingly bored and stopped attending. Financial problems resulting from the Panic of 1837 limited the Institute's publications. During this time it continued to collect scientific specimens, accumulating more than 15,000, and started the state Natural History Survey, both activities that led to the establishment of the New York State Museum.

Van Rensselaer's death in 1839 was another setback for the Institute. Its functions were also duplicated by newer institutions, particularly colleges and universities such as Union College and Rensselaer Polytechnic Institute, that had been established in the Albany area. Throughout the 1840s it remained dormant.

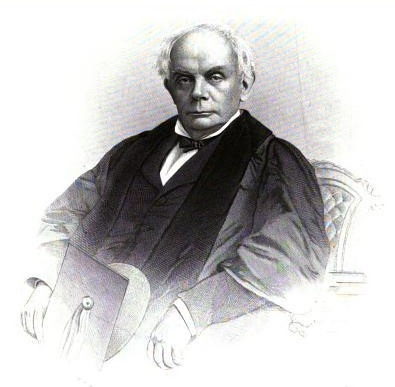
John V.L. Pruyn, who revived the Institute as its president in the mid-19th century

=== 1851–1899: Albany Historical and Art Society ===
The Institute was again revived in 1851, when the new American Association for the Advancement of Science held its third annual meeting at the Albany Academy. As had happened before, the addition of members changed the nature of the organization, making it a learned society interested in many areas besides the natural sciences. John V. L. Pruyn, a Congressman and officer of the New York Central Railroad, became president in 1857 and reoriented the society toward the public rather than the interests of its members. Ten years later, in 1867, the Institute donated its science and natural-history collections to the state Cabinet of Natural History, a predecessor of the state museum. Later it would donate its geological collection.

Celebrations of the city's bicentennial in 1886 included an exhibit at the Albany Academy of historical relics and art from the private collections of many socially prominent Albany families. The Albany Historical and Art Society (AHAS) was established afterward to maintain the collection and find a permanent home for it. Its membership approached nearly 1,200.

By 1897 AHAS had raised enough money to buy a State Street building, on which it built an addition to house all its works. The following year it absorbed the collection of the Albany Gallery of Fine Art, which had been opened in 1846 and closed within a decade due to declining subscriptions. James McDougal Hart had worked there before beginning his artistic career. The gallery's holdings had been kept in trust by the city's Young Men's Association ever since.

=== 1900–1947: Albany Institute for History & Art ===
In 1900, the AHAS and the Albany Institute merged, becoming the Albany Institute and Historical and Art Society. Local judge William Learned Shaw became the combined organization's first president. Four years later it bought the property on which the main building stands. In 1907 the cornerstone of the Fuller & Pitcher Company's Renaissance Revival building was laid, and the building was completed the following year. Mayor Charles Henry Gaus described it as "the capstone of educational development in our city". Its first exhibit, in 1909, was devoted to the tricentennial of Henry Hudson's exploration of the river named after him and the centennial of Robert Fulton's inaugural steamboat voyage up it.

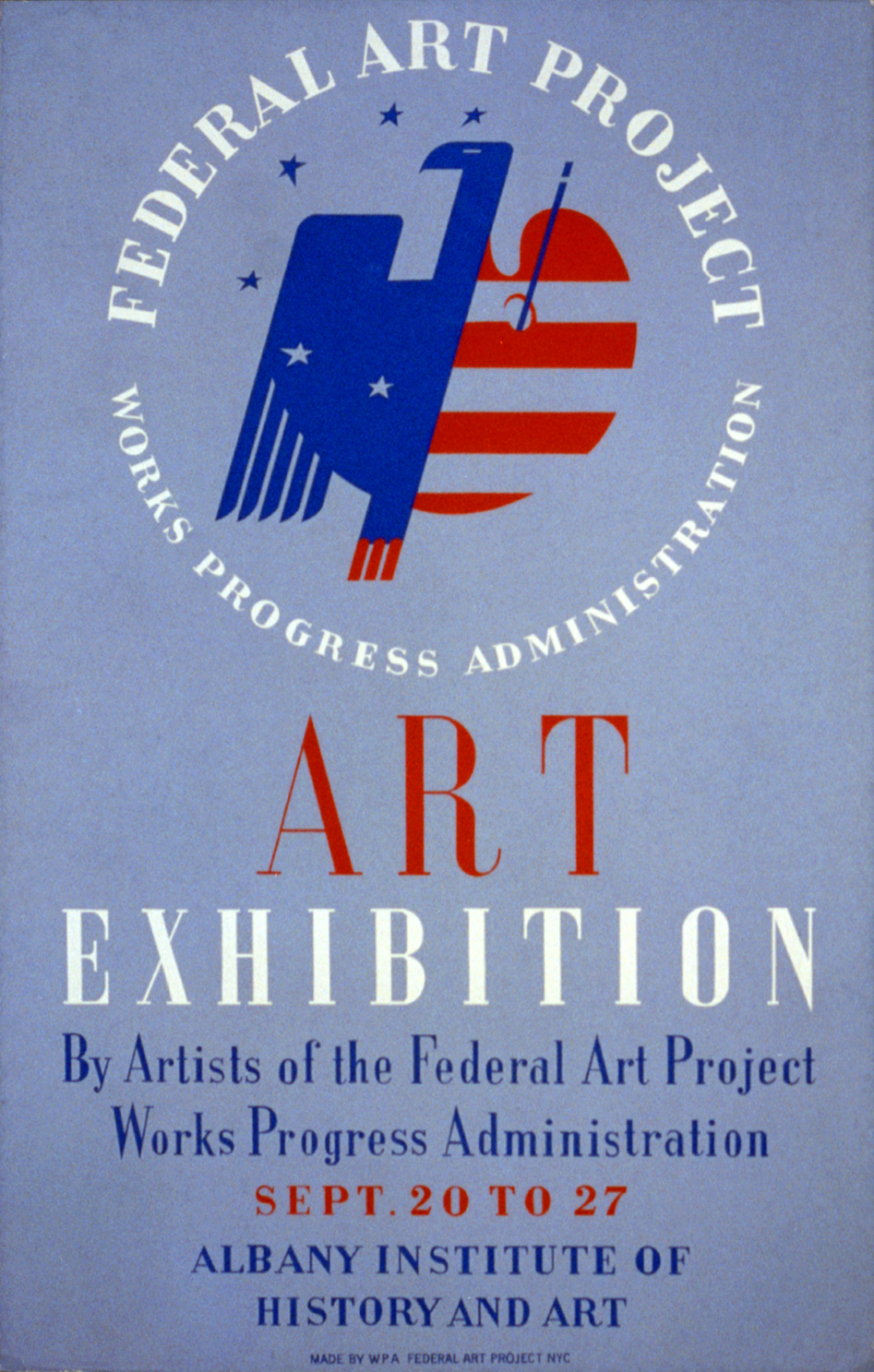
Poster for 1938 exhibition of contemporary regional artists sponsored by Federal Art Project

To clear more space for exhibits, the institute donated some of its books a block away to the newly built Harmanus Bleecker Library in 1924. The newspaper and pamphlet collections were donated to the state museum shortly afterwards. Two years later, it shortened its name to the "more symmetrical" Albany Institute of History & Art." This coincided with the beginning of an effort to make the collections more accessible to the public. Those outreach programs, such as tours, school trips and performances, continued through the Great Depression of the next decade, helping establish the institute as a regional museum. It started the Print Club of Albany, bringing nationally known printmakers to the city for lectures and demonstrations, and hosted an exhibit of contemporary regional art in honor of the 250th anniversary of the city charter in 1936. The latter event led to a continuing commitment in that area.

As the next decade dawned and war began, John Davis Hatch came from the Art Institute of Seattle to take over as AIHA director. He began a series of exhibits of major regional artists. One devoted to Thomas Cole was the first major 20th-century retrospective of his work. In 1945, "The Negro Artist Comes of Age", featured the work of 45 African American artists and drew national attention after it went to the Brooklyn Museum. Behind the scenes, Hatch began the process of modernizing the museum's record-keeping to harmonize with the systems in use at other museums.

=== 1948–present: Emergence as a regional art museum ===
Hatch's assistant Robert Wheeler took over in 1948. He instituted a policy that new acquisitions be from the region or have some connection to it. With that in place, he created special exhibitions devoted to regional work and renovated the galleries.

In 1956 he was in turn succeeded by Janet McFarlane, who was at the time one of only seven women serving as a museum director in the U.S. Five years later, the museum's Women's Council, which has since become a major fundraiser and source of volunteers, was founded. A year after curator Norman Rice began a 20-year tenure as director in 1967, the Rice family donated their old house on the corner, expanded sympathetically in 1940, to the museum. It renovated the 1895 Beaux-Arts home designed by Richard Morris Hunt, architect of the Metropolitan Museum of Art in New York City and several mansions in Newport, Rhode Island, in the style of a 15th-century Italian palazzo for use both as offices and gallery space. As director, Rice would head an acquisition effort that grew the special collections to over a million items before he stepped down in 1986.

Christine Miles took over from him after having directed the Fraunces Tavern museum in Lower Manhattan. Three years later, AIHA held its first Museum Ball and Contemporary Art Auction to raise money for a new Contemporary Collections Fund. The acquisitions it made possible have more than doubled the museum's collections in that area. That year the museum also began a decade-long project to document and better catalog its holdings in order to make them more accessible for researchers as well as the public, part of Miles' effort to position the museum for the upcoming century. In 1990 the City Neighbors project, designed to promote understanding of the people of Albany, produced its first exhibit, a collection devoted to the black experience in the city.

The museum facilities needed to be redesigned, and in 1994 a local architect, Solomon + Bauer, was commissioned for the work. The following year the museum's trustees voted to raise $10 million, later increased to $12.5 million, toward the effort. Sculptor George Rickey donated one of his works, Etoile Variation V, to be permanently installed in the entrance atrium. The money was raised via public and private grants and the museum closed in 1999, moving to temporary quarters on State Street. It reopened in 2001.

== Collection ==
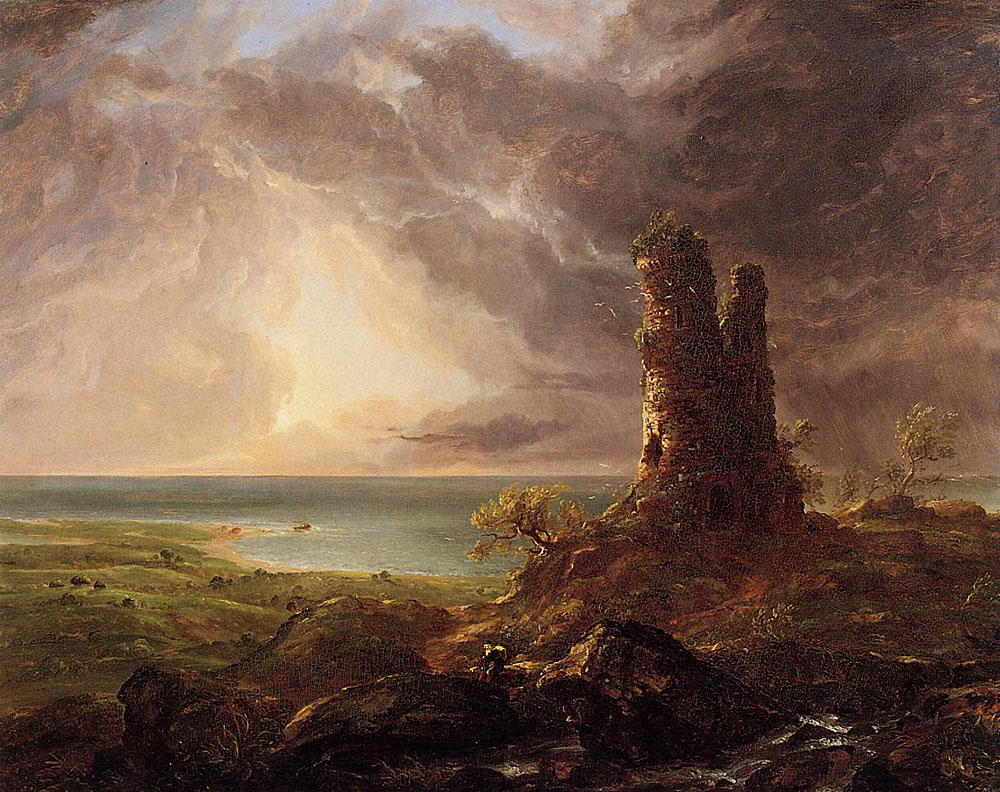
Thomas Cole's Romantic Landscape With Ruined Tower, part of the Institute's collection of Hudson River School art.

AIHA has over 20,000 objects in its permanent collections, including 1600 paintings, 1100 drawings, 4000 prints, 600 sculptures, 500 pieces of furniture, 1200 ceramics, 4000 pieces of clothing and accessories, and 5450 other historical artifacts. Its library collections house 140,000 printed volumes and 85,000 photographs. To supplement its permanent exhibits, the institute hosts a number of traveling exhibitions yearly.

== Gallery ==
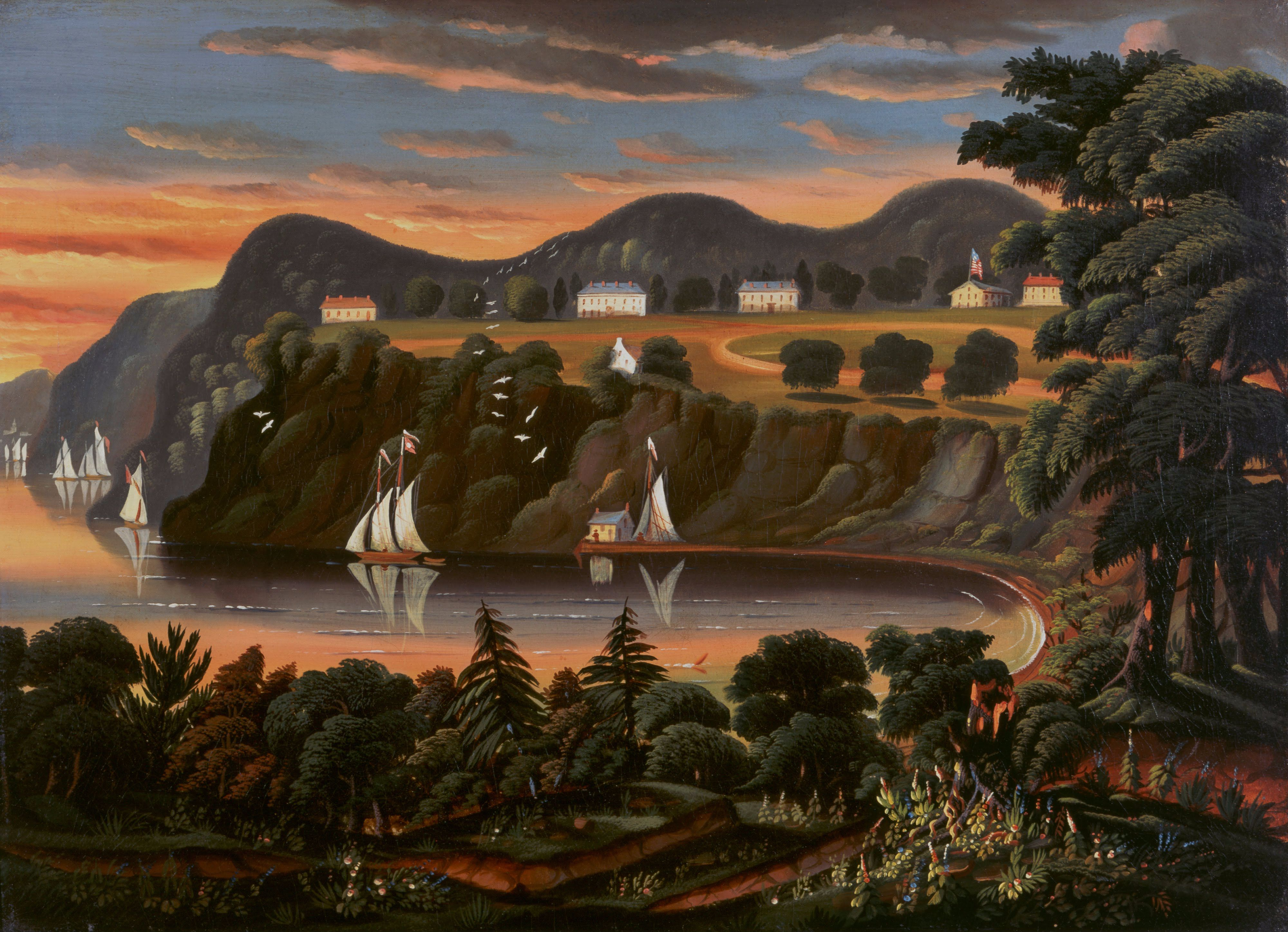
Thomas Chambers

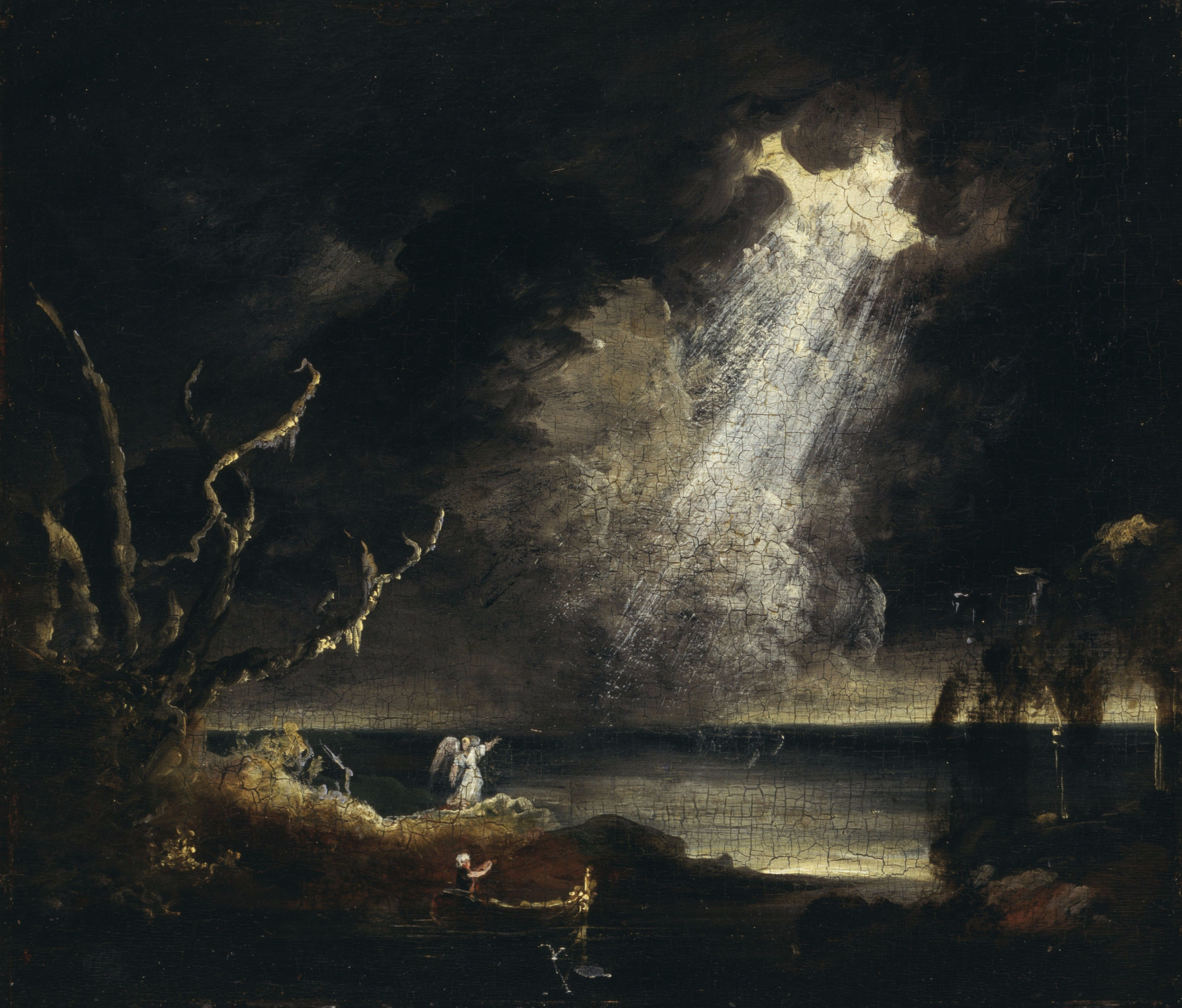
Thomas Cole

== Permanent exhibits ==
The permanent exhibits are located on two floors of the museum's original building.

- The Landscape That Defined America: The Hudson River School: An exhibit in the Hudson River School Gallery featuring paintings by Frederic Church, Thomas Cole, Asher B. Durand, and other artists of the Hudson River School.
- Sense of Place: 18th and 19th Century Paintings and Sculpture: An exhibit in the Lansing Gallery that includes important portraits by Ezra Ames and Ralph Earl, and genre paintings by Walter Launt Palmer and John Thomas Peele.
- 19th Century American Sculpture: An exhibit in the Sculpture Gallery of 20 works by Erastus Dow Palmer, Launt Thompson, and Charles Calverley.
- Ancient Egypt: An exhibit in the Ancient Egypt Gallery featuring the institute's two mummies and other artifacts.
- Traders and Culture: Colonial Albany and the Formation of American Identity: An exhibit in the Colonial Albany Gallery on the city in the 17th and 18th centuries.
- Entry Point Gallery: Visitors entering the museum first come upon this gallery, which houses a sampling of the institute's recent acquisitions.

== Hours and fees ==
External videos
- The Albany Institute's Dutch Collections (10:11), C-SPAN

The Albany Institute of History & Art is open from Wednesday to Saturday from 10:00 a.m. to 5:00 p.m. and Sunday from 12:00 a.m. to 5:00 p.m. Admission costs $10.00 for adults, $8.00 for senior citizens and students, and $6.00 for children aged six to twelve (those under five are free). The library is open on Thursdays from 1:00 to 4:30 p.m. and by appointment. The museum has a parking lot in the rear.

== See also ==
- List of museums in New York
- National Register of Historic Places listings in Albany, New York
- George Rogers Howell, secretary
