= University Club of Albany =

- U.S. National Register of Historic Places
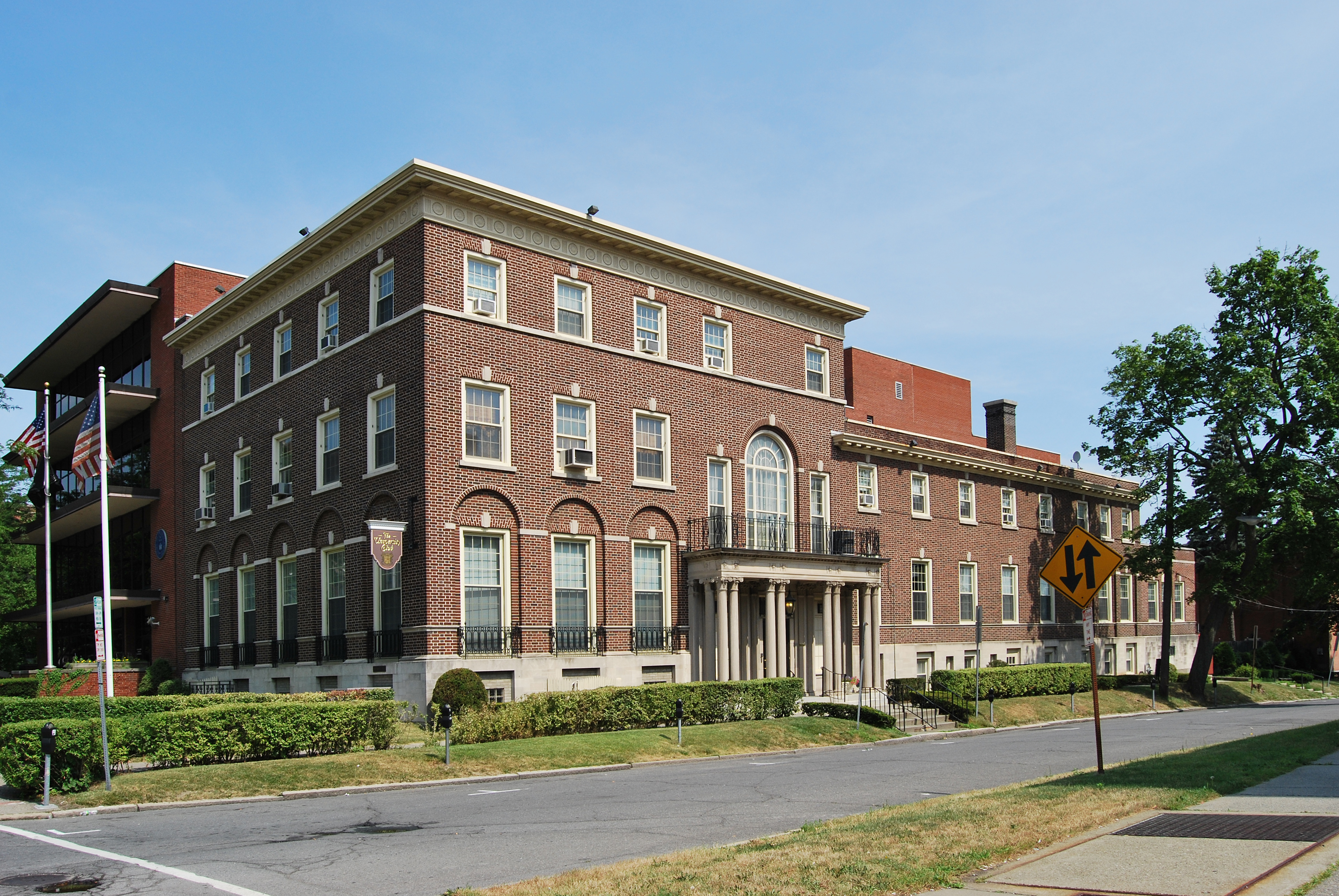
- South profile and east (front) elevation, 2011

- Location within New York
- Location: Albany, NY
- Coordinates: 42°39′21″N 73°45′39″W
- Built: 1924
- Architect: Fuller & Robinson Company
- Architectural style: Colonial Revival
- NRHP reference No.: 11000268
- Added to NRHP: May 11, 2011

The University Club of Albany, New York, was a social club founded in 1901 that closed in 2022. It was most recently housed in a Colonial Revival brick building at the corner of Washington Avenue (New York State Route 5) and Dove Street.

In 2011 that building was listed on the National Register of Historic Places.After purchasing the building in 2022 for $950,000, Business for Good donated use of the building to the Albany Black Chamber of Commerce, which opened its doors in February 2023.

Young men who had recently graduated from college founded the club in the early 20th century as a place to gather until they had achieved the social status necessary to follow their fathers into the older Fort Orange Club. It met in one founder's house for several years until it could purchase a house that stood at its last location, on which it built a wing. When that house burned down in the 1920s, Albany architects the Fuller & Robinson company designed the current main building to replace it. It was his last major work in the city.

The club has played a role in the city's social and cultural life since its founding. Speakers at its events in its early years included President William Howard Taft, Andrew Carnegie, Earl Grey and various governors of New York. Its amenities include a library, dining facilities, meeting rooms, and one of the oldest bowling alleys in the country, which may also be the oldest private bowling alley in continual use in the state.

== Buildings and grounds ==
The club's complex occupies the three buildings on the lot along Dove between Washington and Elk Street, at the northwest corner of the intersection. The neighborhood is in a very densely developed section of Albany just two blocks west of the state capitol, a National Historic Landmark located in the Lafayette Park Historic District, also listed on the National Register. One block to the east is the State Department of Education building, another listed property.

In the blocks around the club are many commercial and institutional buildings, some listed on the Register as well. Across Dove Street are the Classical Revival Harmanus Bleecker Library and Albany Institute of History and Art, both with portions designed by Albert Fuller as well. A block west at Lark Street (U.S. Route 9W) is the Washington Avenue Armory. Across Washington Avenue from the armory is the Walter Merchant House. The Alfred E. Smith State Office Building towers to the southeast at the corner of Washington and South Swan Street, dwarfed in turn by the modern Empire State Plaza to its southeast.

North of Elk Street is Sheridan Park, with a large parking area in the center. South of Washington are the residential blocks of the Center Square/Hudson–Park Historic District. The Washington Park Historic District, Albany's largest, is to the southwest on the other side of Lark. The proposed Lower Washington Avenue Historic District would include the buildings across the street from the club.

=== Exterior ===
The main club building is a three-story five-by-five-bay structure of brick laid in Flemish bond with wooden trim on a raised limestone basement topped by a flat roof. A two-story wing, with a one-story wing of its own, projects to the north along Dove. At the north end of the main block, a set of steps lead up from the street, which has no sidewalk, to an elaborate entrance portico. Low hedges set off the property at the corner and for a short distance north of the main entrance.

Fenestration begins with recessed glass block windows in the basement. Above them, on the first story, 12-over-16 double-hung sash windows are set in recessed arched openings with keystones and splayed-brick lintels. At the lower end are ornate iron balustrades. A molded limestone stringcourse runs around the building at the level of the balustrades' top.

On the second floor are eight-over-eight double-hung sash with the same lintel treatment and stone sills. A squared limestone stringcourse serves as the sill for the slightly smaller but otherwise similar windows on the third floor. Above them is a classically decorated frieze, with a wide modillioned cornice marking the roofline.

The two northern bays of the east (front) facade are given over to the main entrance portico. Four clusters of paired round fluted Ionic columns, with the two on the sides having a third, topped by a classical entablature and frieze, support a flat roof with iron balustrade. A Palladian-style window, with French door, opens on to the balcony. Above it on the third story is a blind bay.

To the north the two-story wing continues the brickwork and window treatment on the main block, minus the recessed arches on the first story, except in the northern two of its eight bays. At its roof is the same cornice treatment as that found on the main block, but without the frieze. It is topped with a short parapet; a large brick chimney pierces the roof near the north end. On the one-story wing, formerly a porch, this detail is further reduced, with the cornice giving way to a flush limestone stringcourse. There is also only a single rectangular window on the basement, fully exposed at this point.

=== Interior ===
The main entrance opens into a mid-floor vestibule with a marble floor and short stairs leading up and down. In the former direction, the basement has a large lounge, bar and dining area in the front, with terrazzo flooring and a four-lane bowling alley in the rear. The remaining space is given over to restrooms, storage and maintenance facilities.

Up the steps is a lounge with fireplace. On its west is the large living room and meeting space that runs the full length of that side of the building. It has full-height windows and a fireplace. Other decoration includes projecting chimney breasts, engaged pilasters, molded shadow box panels, broad crown moldings and encased ceiling beams. Medallions representing the alma maters of the founding members form a frieze on some walls. In the rear is the large main dining room and its supporting kitchen, as well as the club's office and library. The Terrace Room runs along the rear facade.

On the second floor, reached by either the main or secondary stair, is the President's Room and billiards room in the front of the building, along with more office and restroom space. In the rear wing are 13 sleeping rooms, with closets but without private bathrooms. The third floor has 10 more sleeping rooms, three of which have their own bathrooms. A rear door leads onto the roof.

=== Outbuildings ===
At the north end of the property are two additional buildings, both used by the club. They are separated from it by a stretch of lawn. Both have been extensively altered and are not considered contributing resources to the National Register listing.

The first is a three-story brick structure that houses the club's squash courts. North of it, at the corner of Dove and Elk, is a two-and-a-half-story wood frame barn. Both were originally used as carriage houses for the late 19th-century mansion that was the original clubhouse.

== History ==
The club was formed in 1901 by several young men from prominent and wealthy Albany families. They had all returned to the city after graduating from college, and wanted to get together occasionally and continue some aspects of their undergraduate experience such as singing and talking together, following the lead of other similar groups at the time in cities such as Chicago and San Francisco. Their fathers were, for the most part, members of the Fort Orange Club, Albany's oldest gentlemen's club, whose clubhouse is located a block to the east along Washington Avenue from the current site.

The young men who founded the University Club assumed that, eventually, they would follow in their fathers' footsteps and join the Fort Orange Club when they reached sufficient age, and hoped that the University Club would establish itself as a junior to the Fort Orange Club. That latter organization was one of four prominent clubs in the city at the time, all of which had a waiting list for membership at least three years long. As such, any new club would have to have a distinctive feature to attract members.

After two meetings at the old Albany Academy building in Lafayette Park attracted 140 interested young men, the club was incorporated and chartered. Nineteen members were elected as officers and directors, per the new organization's constitution, which limited the club to 175 members in residence. All had to be graduates of a college or university of recognized standing, or the U.S. Military or Naval academies. Its stated aims were "to establish and maintain a library, assembly and reading rooms; to promote social discourse among its members and to maintain and cultivate university spirit in the city of Albany." They chose as their motto the Latin phrase Sapere Aude — Incipe, meaning "Dare to be wise — Begin".

The entrance fee was $25 ($1,000 in modern dollars) for residents and $15 ($600 in modern dollars) for non-residents. Annual dues were $30 ($1,200 in modern dollars) for residents and $15 for non-residents. Unlike other clubs the latter requirement did not stipulate a time for which the applicant had to have lived in the city.

Within two months the club had found its first building, a former residence at 99 Washington Avenue. Six years later, the club bought another former residence at the current location, previously the home of the late George Amsdell, owner of Albany's largest brewery at that time. It set about spending $10,000 ($346,000 in modern dollars) to remodel the three-bay Queen Anne style structure with a prominent angular, turreted bay for use as a clubhouse. This new home served the club well, as it enabled the launch of a speaker's series in 1908. The club entertained guest speakers such as Andrew Carnegie and Governor Charles Evans Hughes the following year.

In 1910 two of the speakers chosen became major Albany events. President William Howard Taft accepted the group's invitation to one of its dinners, and the whole city welcomed him. People came from miles around to see Taft. Also present was Earl Grey, then governor general of Canada. More than 300 attended the club's annual dinner at the Ten Eyck Hotel, leading the Times Union to claim that "probably more distinguished men were at the speaker's table than at any other banquet ever held in Albany."

The club's success brought with it the need to expand its space. By 1913 it had 335 total members. The following year it began construction of what is now the north wing in order to provide space for a restaurant and additional sleeping rooms. As general contractor, the club chose the Hoggson Brothers firm of New York. The Hoggsons, both Yale graduates, had handled the 1914 construction of the north wing. Their firm pioneered the concept of combining design and construction, including many building trades, in one company. Their new wing, with brick surfaces, clean lines, symmetries and flat roof, was a radical change from the asymmetric, angular and irregular building it was attached to.

Over the next three years the club modified its membership requirements in response to World War I. A 1915 amendment to its constitution permitted recent graduates to defer half their entrance fees and dues for up to three years after graduation. Another amendment the following year created associate memberships, for those with a business in the city but living outside its boundaries. Finally, in 1917, with U.S. entry into the war, the club voted to excuse any member absent by virtue of military service outside the city from paying dues for the duration of hostilities.

In 1923, the main clubhouse was damaged in a fire. It remained standing and structurally sound, but enough of the interior was exposed to the elements during the subsequent winter that the club decided to replace it. Bids were sought from three different firms; the firm of Fuller & Robinson received the commission.

Albert Fuller, cofounder of the firm, had enjoyed a long and distinguished career in Albany. Either by himself or with different firms, he had designed a number of the city's notable buildings during that period, many today listed on the National Register. Around the same time, he was building the Harmanus Bleecker Library across Dove Street, a brick Classical Revival structure that complements the club buildings, and his Renaissance Revival 1908 Albany Institute of History and Art building directly opposite the club. For the club, he produced a building that was far more sympathetic to the ten-year-old wing than the original building. It would be his last major work in Albany, as he died ten years later.

W.G. Sheehan, the contractors, began work as soon as the bid was awarded with the goal of opening the new building by summer of 1925. During construction, the club added to its punch list a refrigeration plant and fire alarm system. The job's final cost was $185,000 ($3.48 million in modern dollars), more than twice the original budget. A grand reopening was held in May 1925. By autumn it was apparent that it had been a success, as October and November were the best months for business the club had recorded up to that point.

== Membership and amenities ==
The University Club eventually began to admit women as members. Applicants generally needed to have graduated from a recognized college or university, although some memberships have been set aside for those who have not. Prospective members needed to be sponsored by two members and meet with the membership committee before being approved by the board.

There were several classes of membership. The primary one was resident membership, for those who live in the counties that constitute the greater Capital District which includes Albany, Columbia, Greene, Rensselaer, Saratoga, Schenectady and Schoharie counties. Those residents who lived close enough to the club, the Albany neighborhoods of Center Square/Hudson–Park, Mansion, Washington Park or Park South, were eligible for neighbor memberships and paid the lowest fees and dues. Non-resident members also pay less. There were also joint memberships for married couples, clergy and corporate memberships and junior memberships for those under 35.

Members were able to take advantage of the club's dining facilities, which came without a monthly minimum. They also had access to a billiards room and bowling alley. The latter hosted both open bowling and league nights. Free Wi-Fi was available throughout the building. Members also got reciprocal privileges at over a hundred other private clubs throughout the country.

== See also ==
- List of traditional gentlemen's clubs in the United States
- National Register of Historic Places listings in Albany, New York
