= John Thomas Peele =

American painter

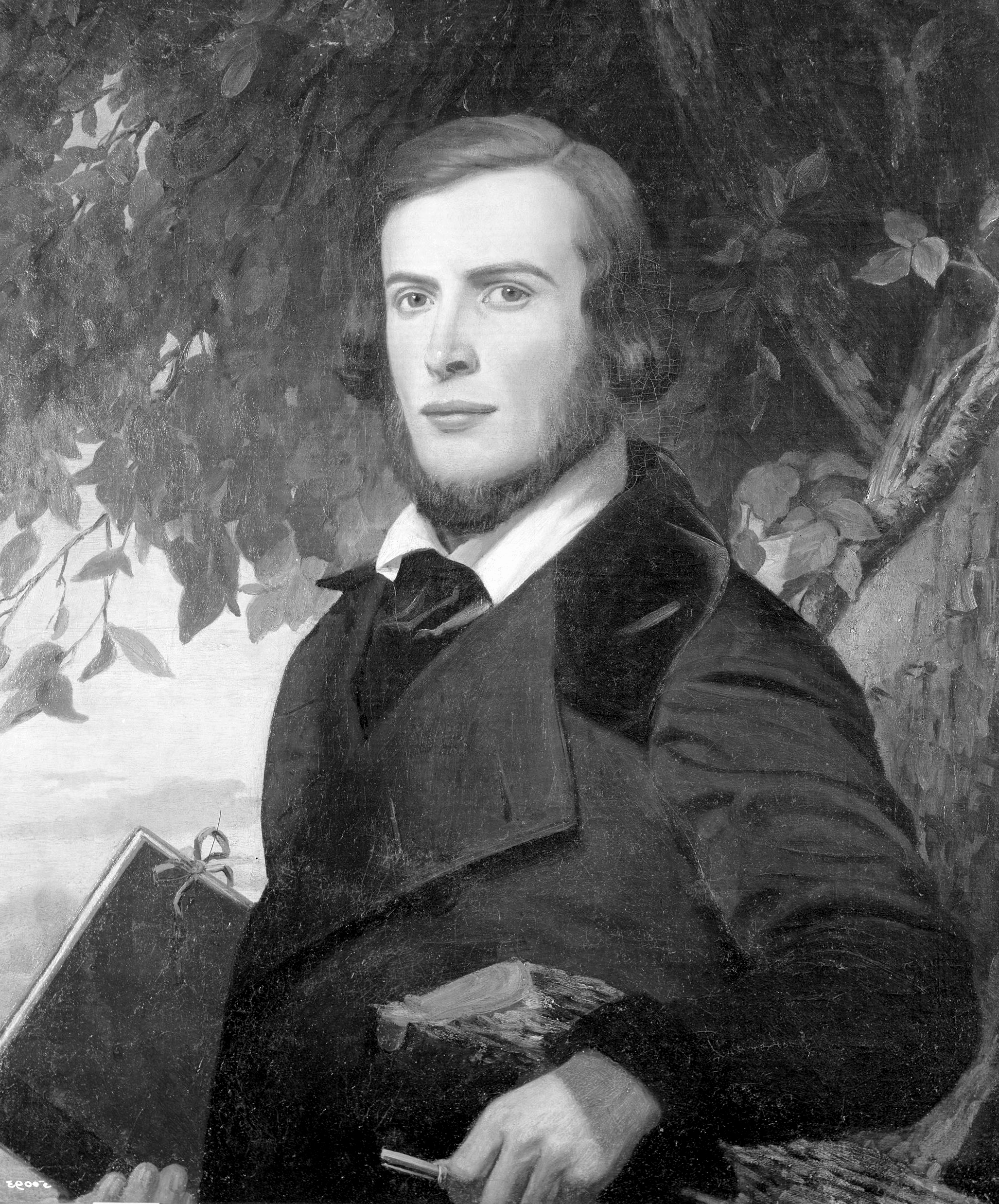
- John Thomas Peele's Self-Portrait of 1846
- Born: 1822; Peterborough, Northamptonshire
- Died: 1897 (aged 74–75); England
- Education: National Academy of Design
- Known for: Portraits and genre subjects

John Thomas Peele (1822-1897) was a British painter specializing in portraits, landscapes, and genre scenes.

Born in Peterborough, Northamptonshire, Peele immigrated to America with his parents in about 1834. The family settled in Buffalo, New York, where Peele began painting. In 1840, he traveled to New York City to continue his artistic training and enrolled in the National Academy of Design's antique class. Peele remained in New York City for approximately eighteenth months and then settled in Albany, where he worked as a portrait painter for two years. From 1841 to 1844, Peele was in London attempting to launch a career as a society portraitist, but he failed to win substantial patronage. He returned to New York by 1845 and switched his focus to ideal genre subjects featuring children. The artist achieved some popularity with his sentimental compositions, eventually becoming a member of the National Academy of Design. In approximately 1851, he relocated to London. From 1852 to 1891, he exhibited at the Royal Academy, the British Institution, and the Society of British Artists, to which he was elected in 1872. During this period, his work was also featured in exhibitions held at the Royal Society of Artists in Birmingham and the Glasgow Institute of the Fine Arts. Although the artist kept a studio in London throughout the second half of his career, he spent extended periods in Liverpool, Douglas (Isle of Man), and Bexley Heath, Kent, where he maintained a second home after 1865. His career flourished during the last decades of his life. Prominent figures such as Prince Albert and the American landscape painter Frederick Edwin Church purchased several of his paintings and the dealers Messrs. Graves & Co. published engravings after his compositions.

== Gallery ==
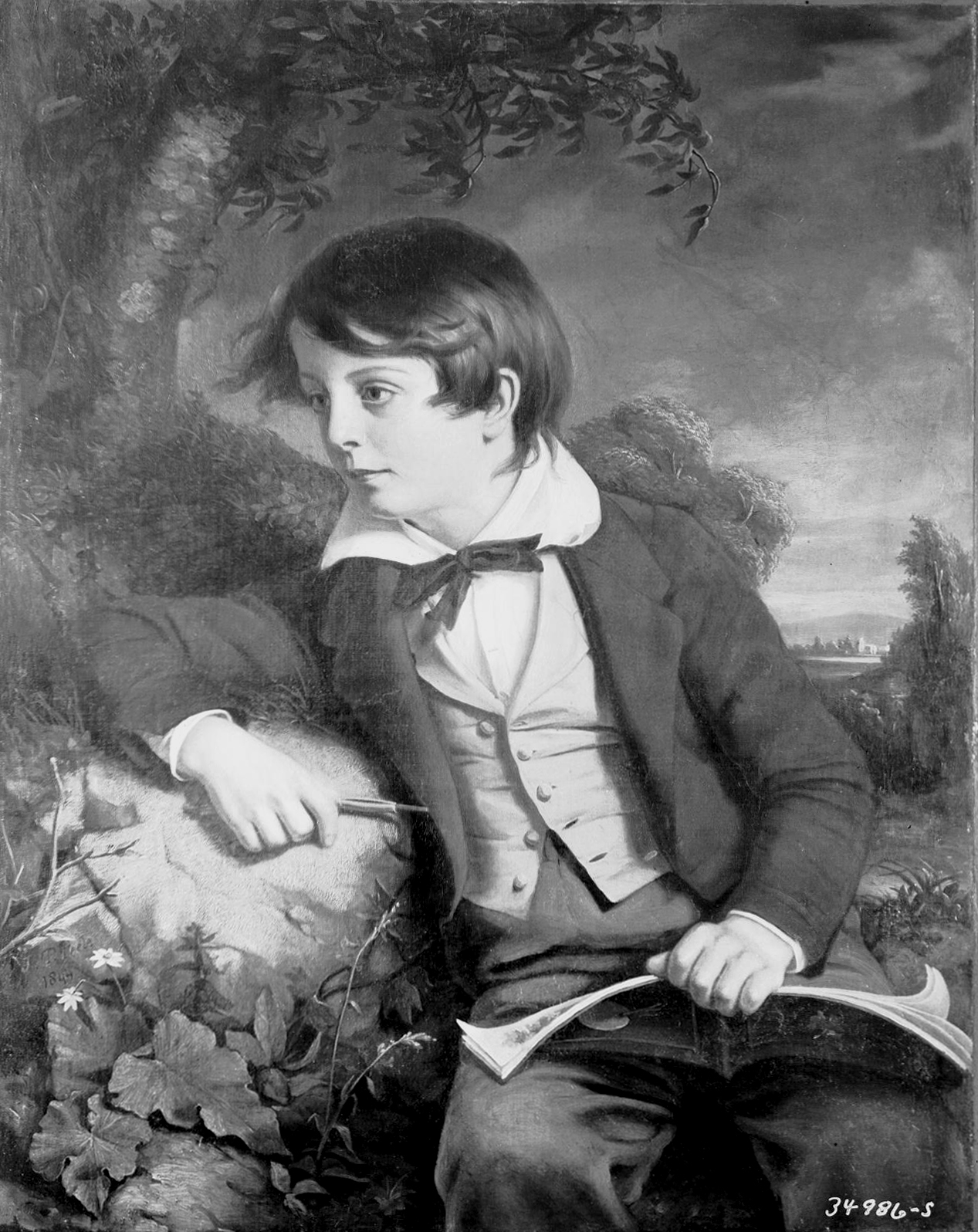
John Thomas Peele, "Portrait of a Boy," 1844. Oil on canvas, 33 x 26 1/2 in. Museum of the City of New York, New York

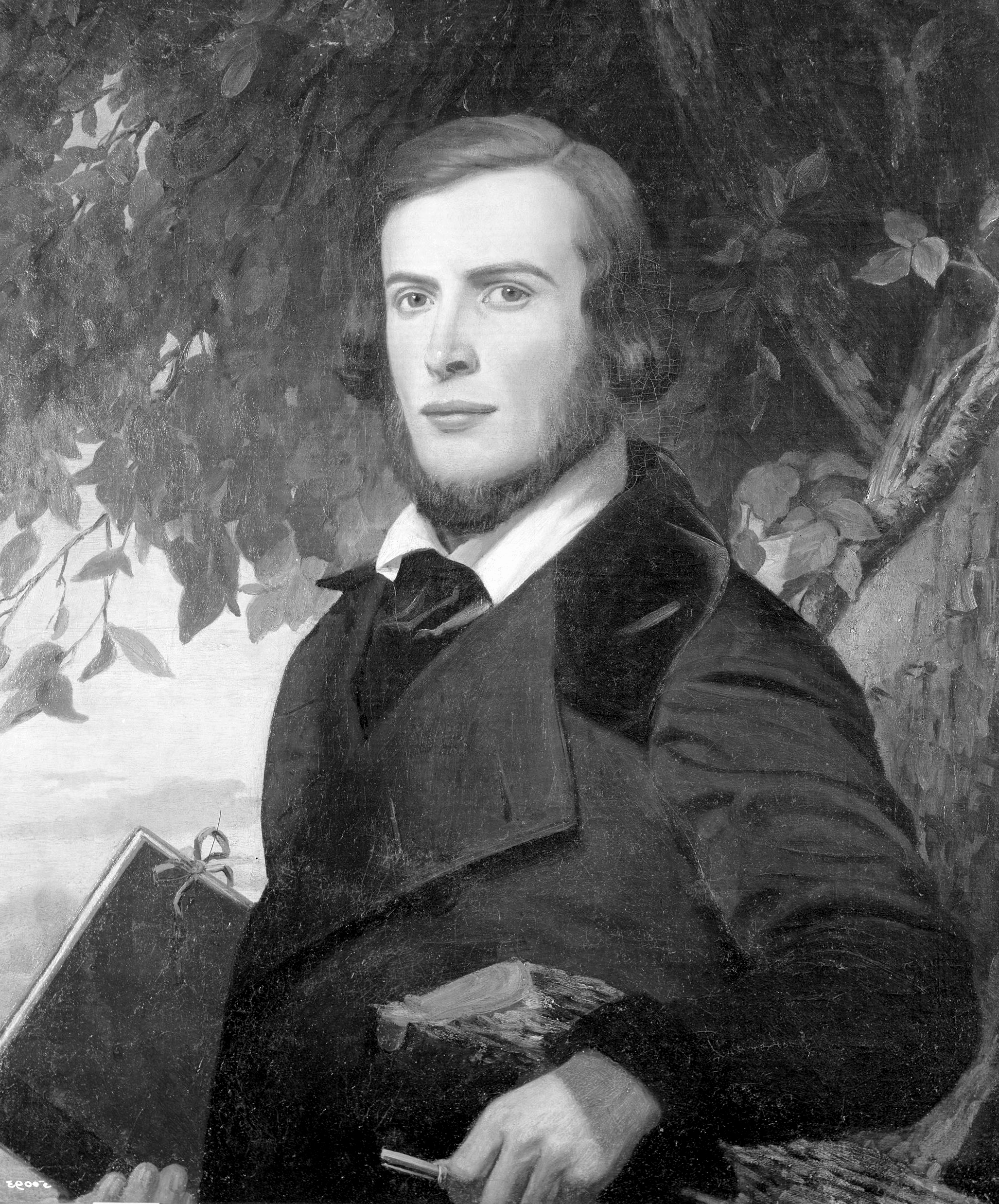
John Thomas Peele, Self-Portrait, 1846. Oil on canvas mounted on academy board, 28 x 24 in. National Academy of Design, New York

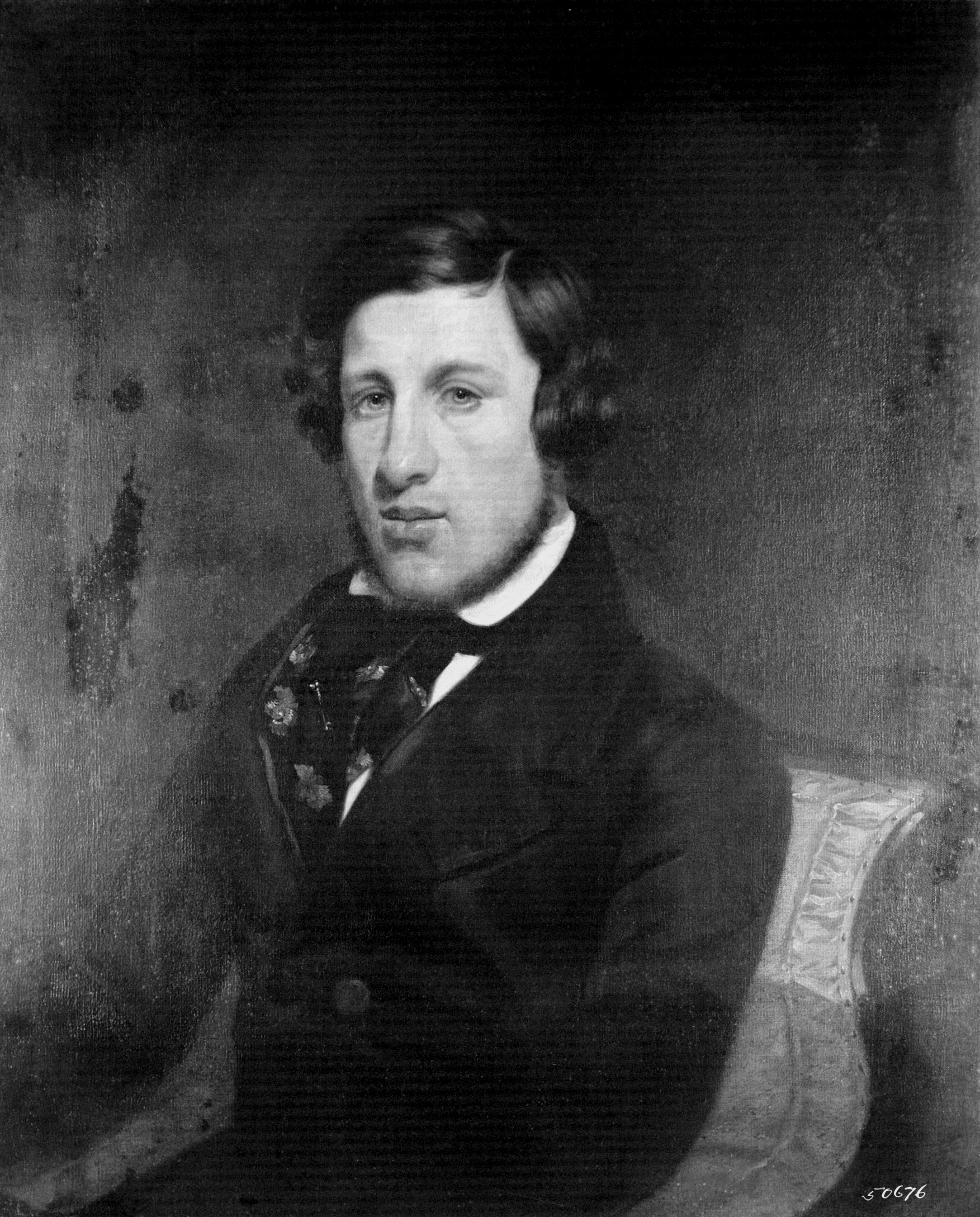
John Thomas Peele, John Motley, undated. Oil on canvas, 29 x 24 in. Private collection, Bedford, New York

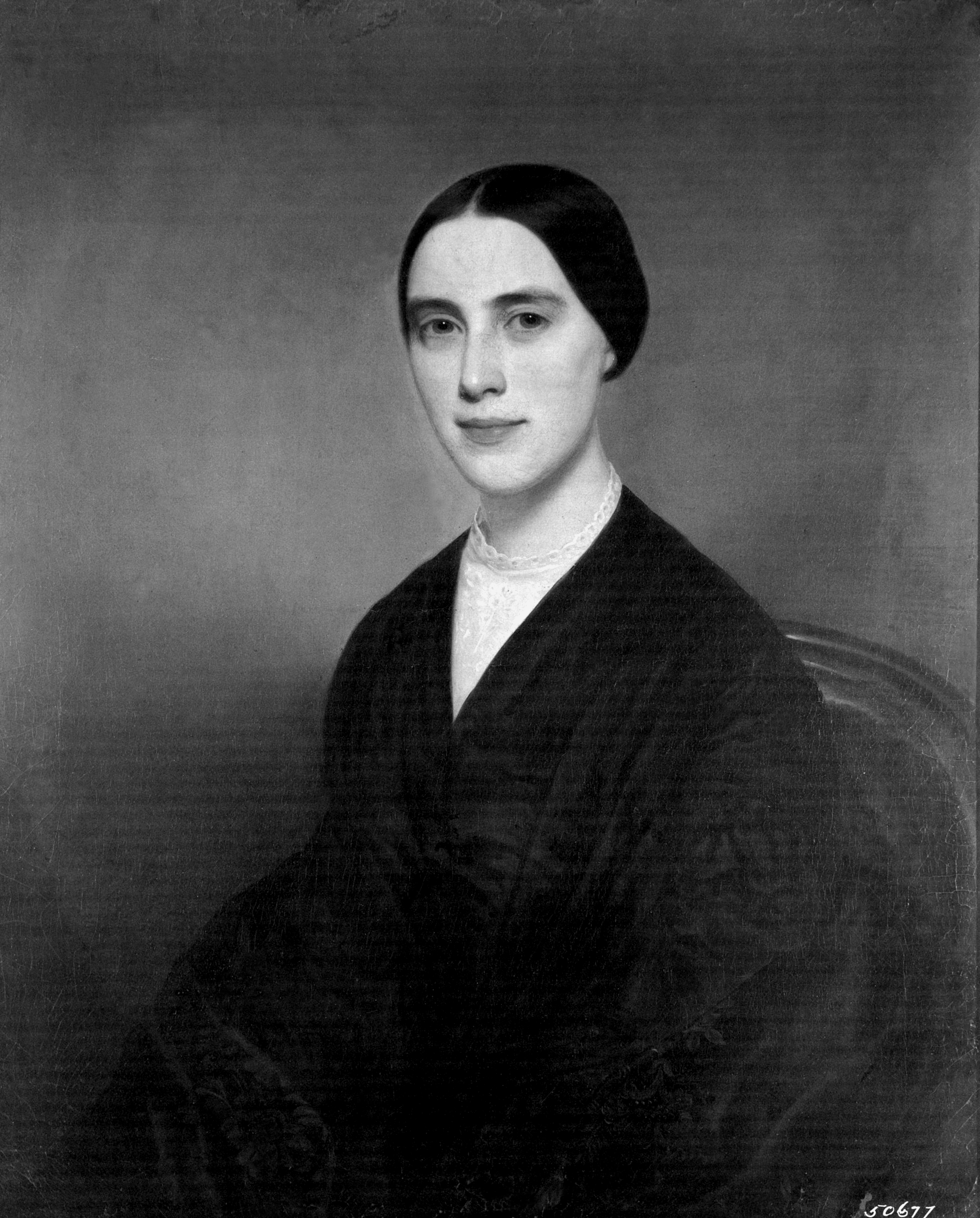
John Thomas Peele, Mrs. Jon Motley (Susan Bogardus), undated. Oil on canvas, 29 x 24 in. Private collection, Bedford, New York

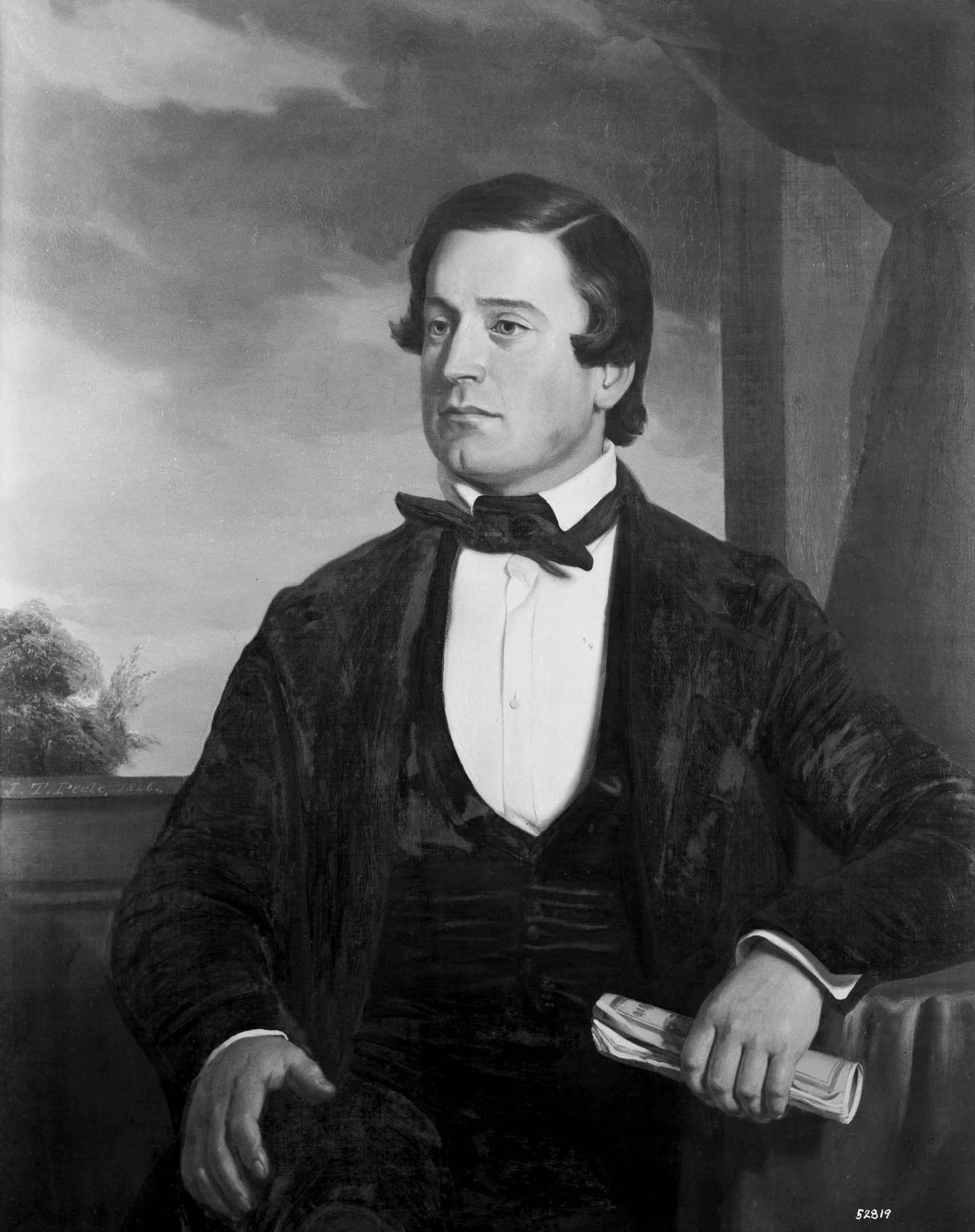
John Thomas Peele, Luther Elting, undated. Oil on canvas, 36 x 29 in. Ulster County Historical Society, Marbletown, New York

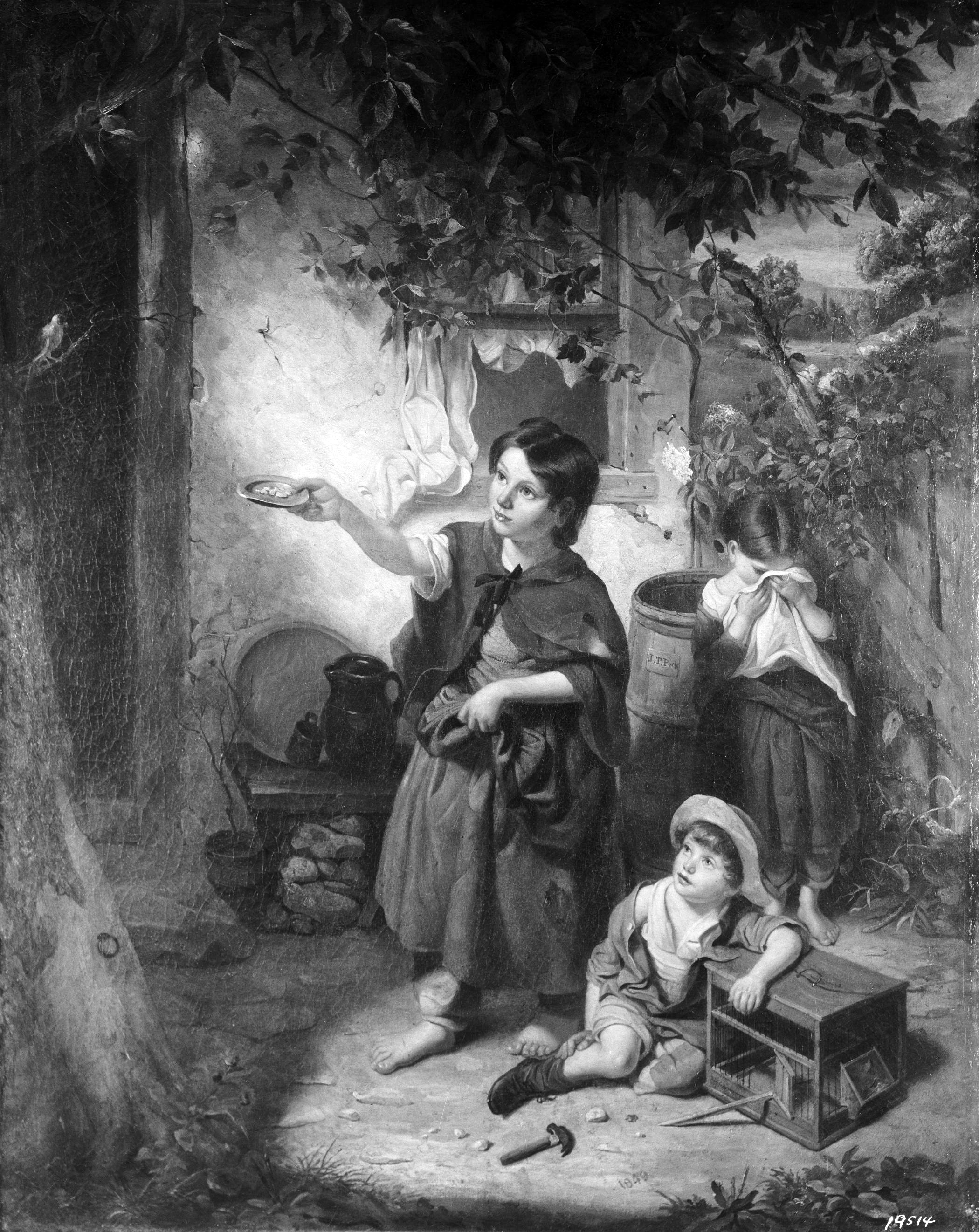
John Thomas Peele, The Stray Bird, 1849. Oil on canvas. Private collection, New Orleans, Louisiana

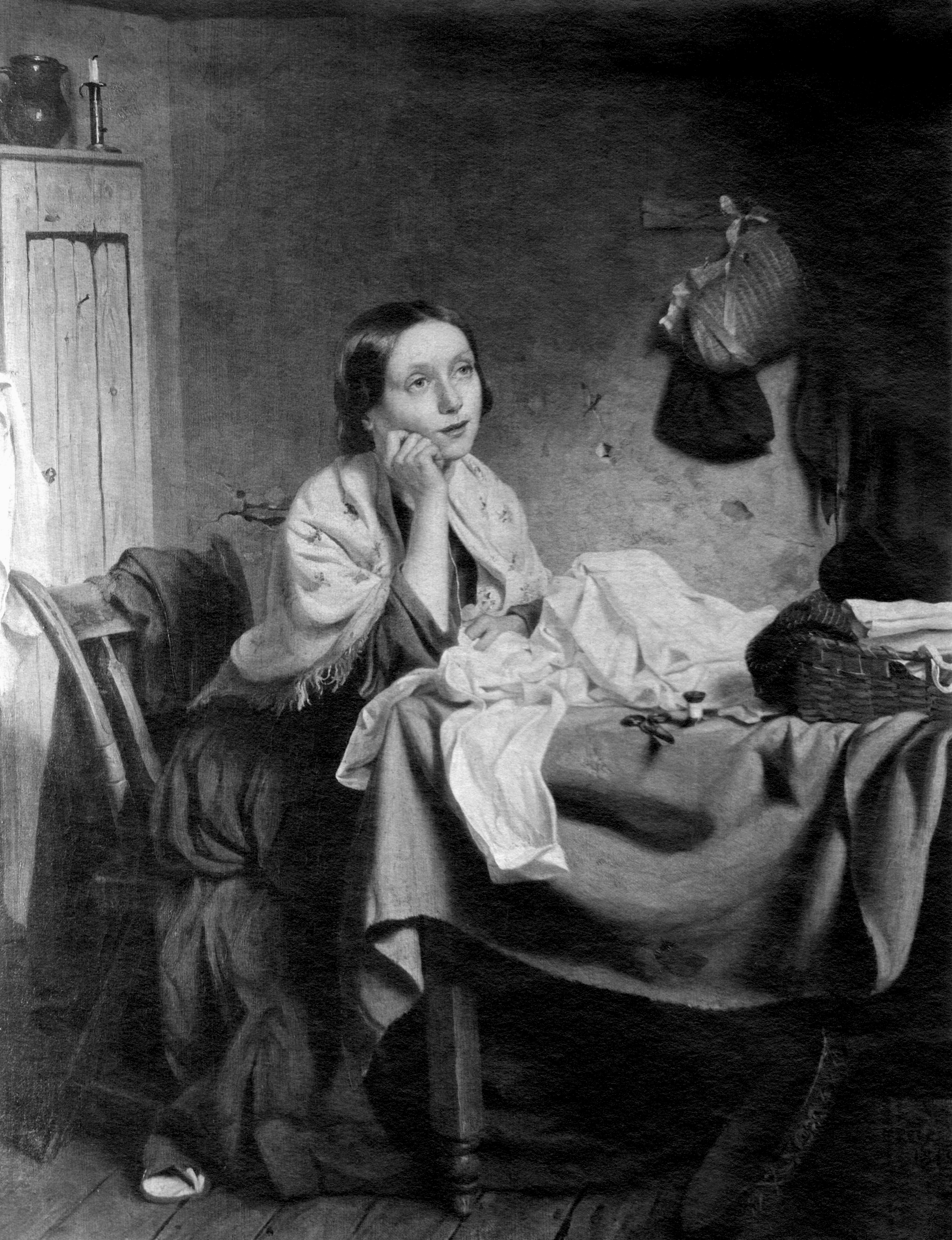
John Thomas Peele, Song of the Shirt, 1849. Oil on canvas, 25 x 19 1/2 in. Albany Institute of History and Art, Albany, New York

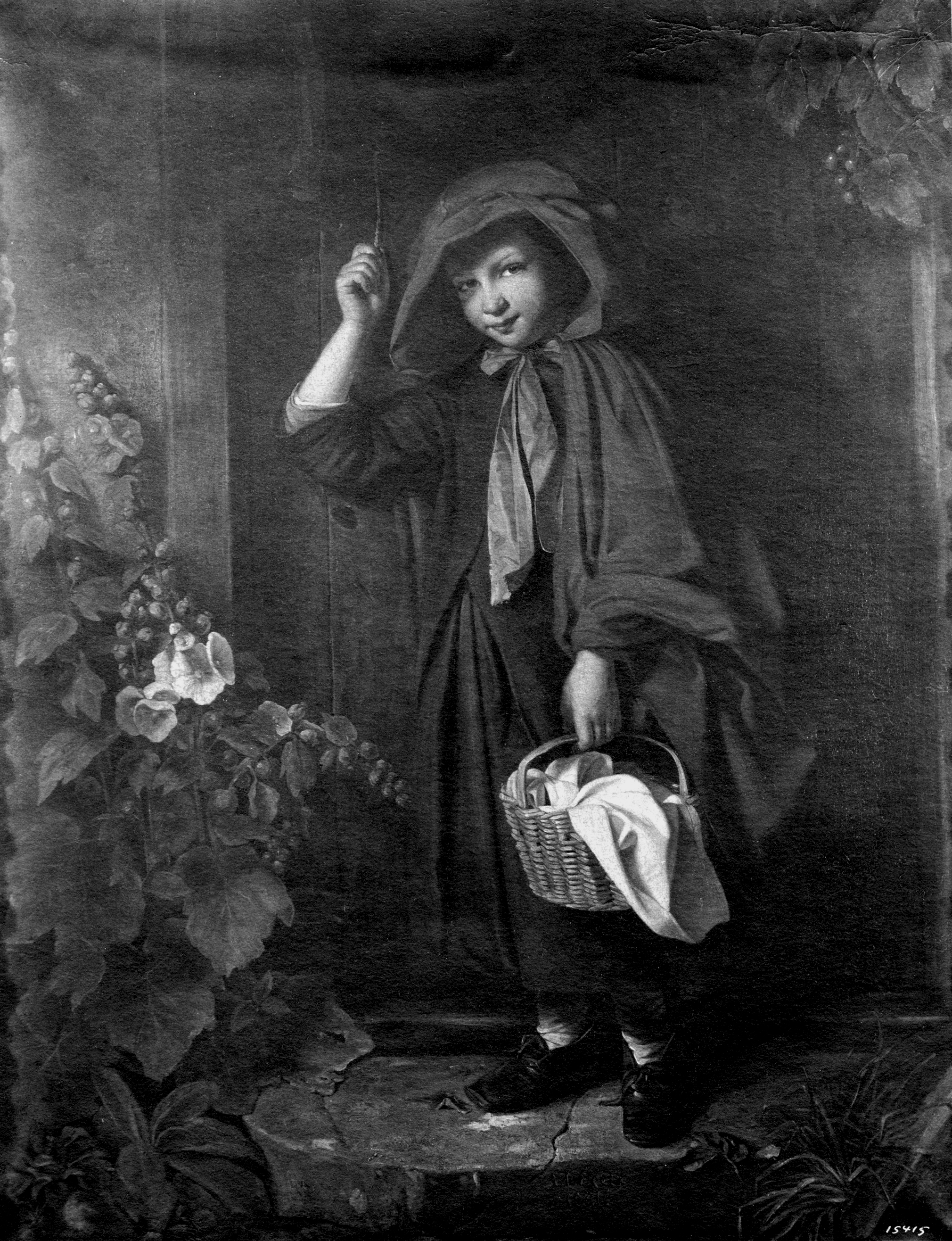
John Thomas Peele, Little Red Riding Hood, 1851. Oil on canvas, 49 x 38 in. Private collection, Kenwood, New York

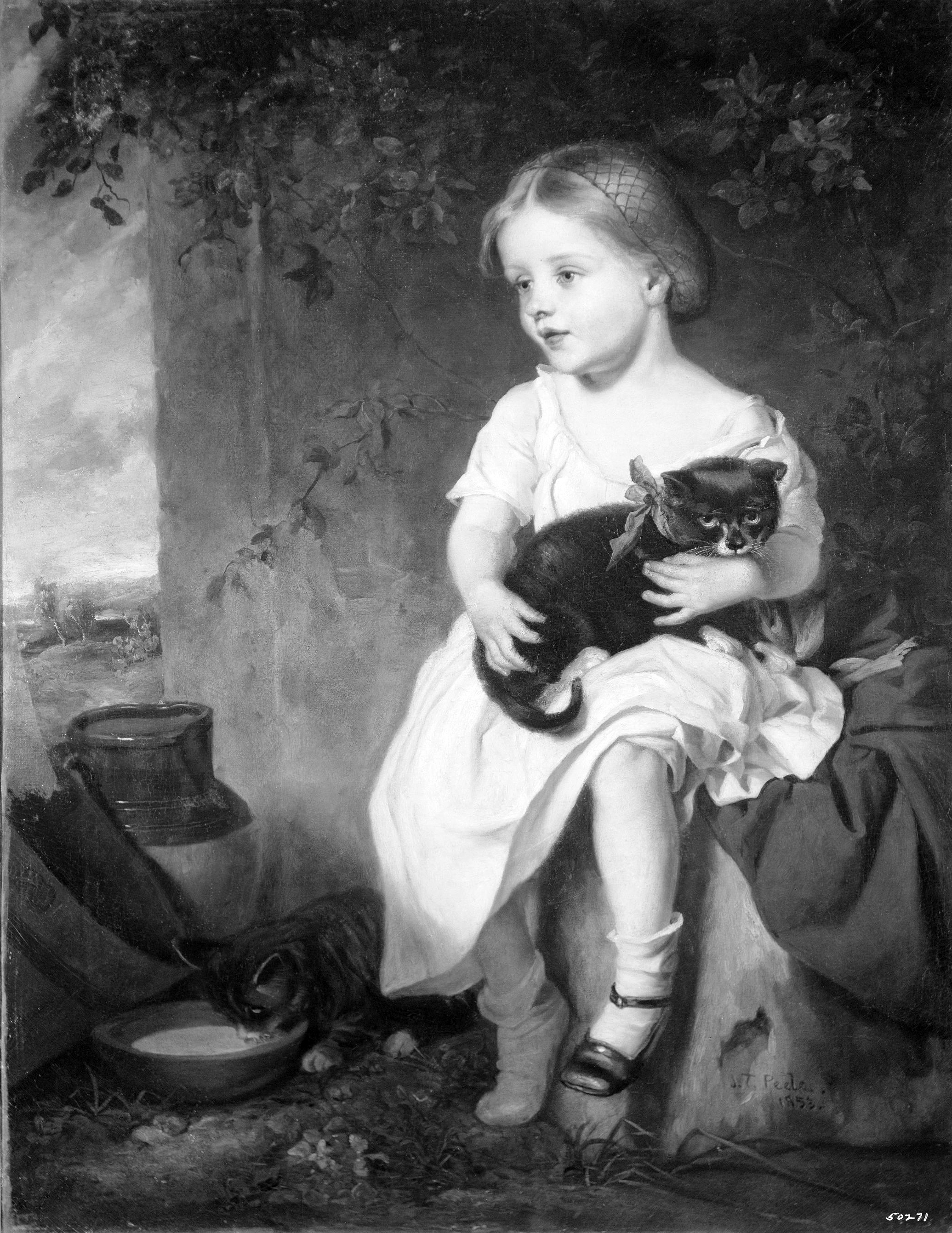
John Thomas Peele, The Pet, 1853. Oil on canvas mounted on Masonite, 36 x 28 in. National Academy of Design, New York

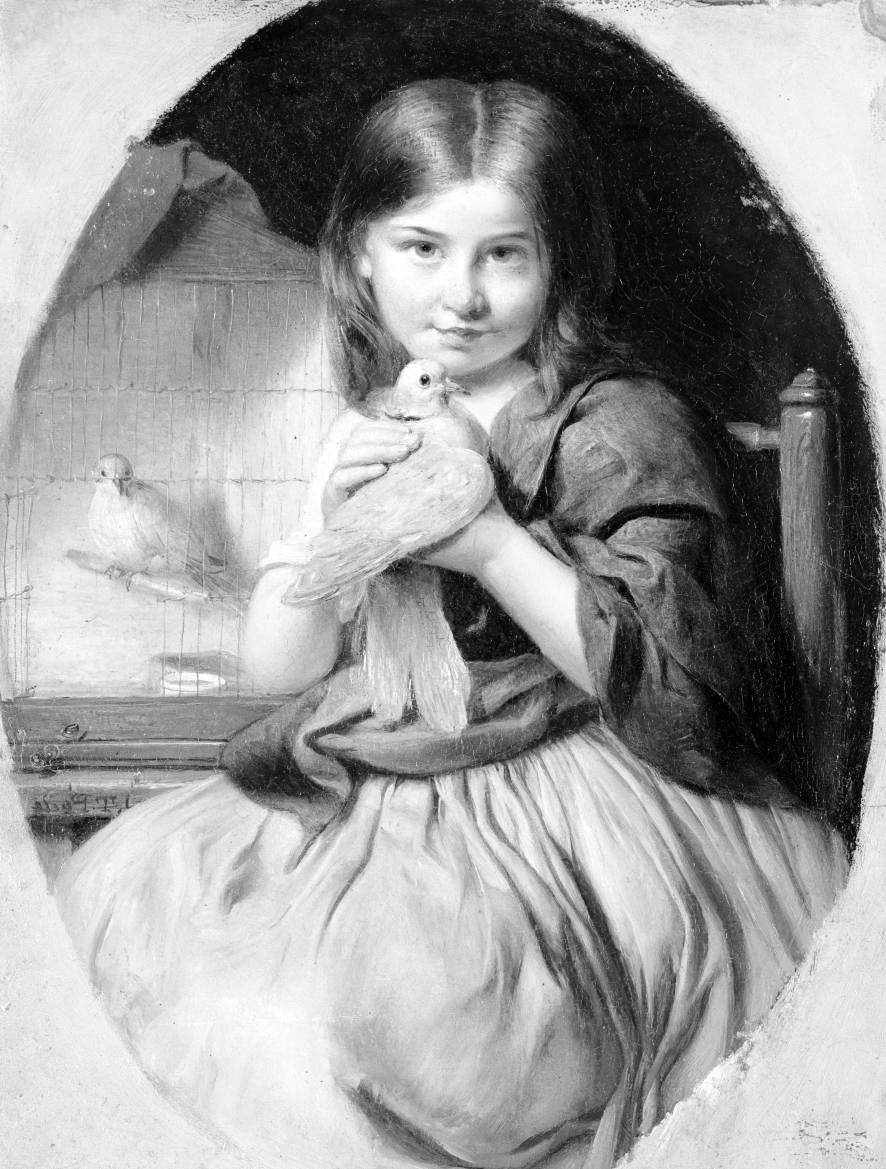
John Thomas Peele, Girl with Doves, 1858. Oil on academy board, 15 1/8 x 11 3/8 in. Olana State Historic Site, Hudson, New York

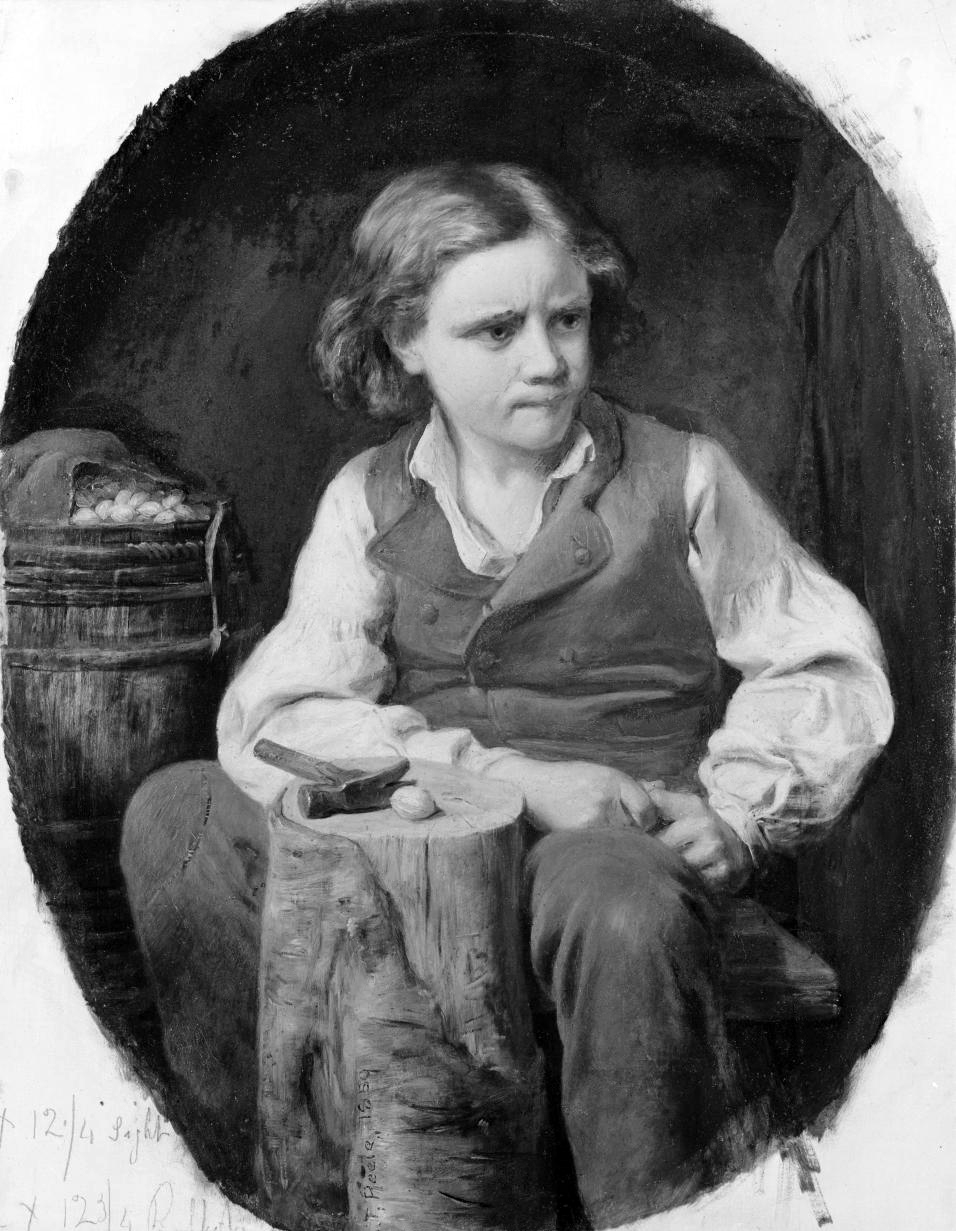
John Thomas Peele, Pain (Boy Cracking Nuts), 1859. Oil on canvas, 16 1/2 x 12 3/4 in. Olana State Historic Site, Hudson, New York

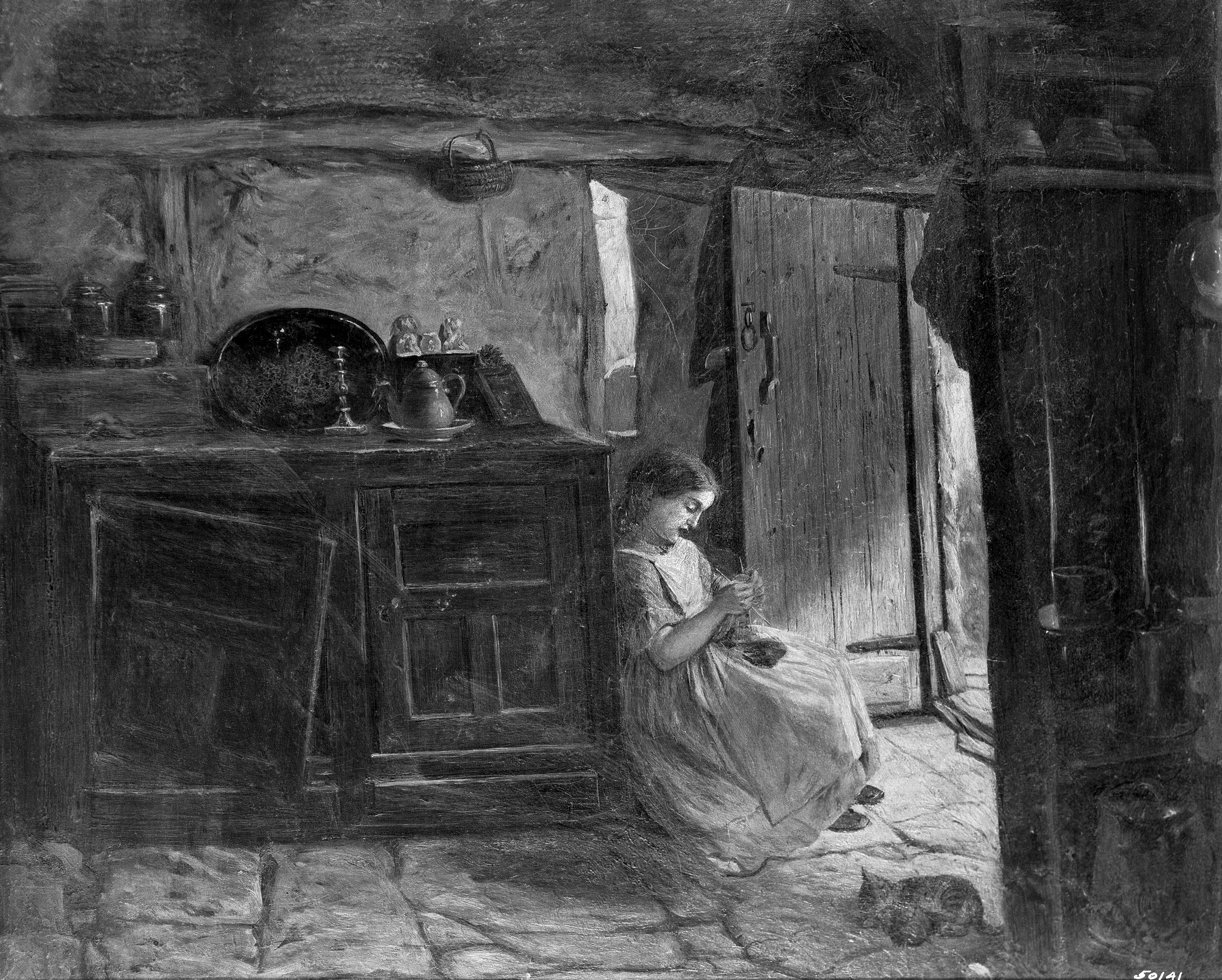
John Thomas Peele, Welch Interior, 1873. Oil on canvas, 20 x 24 in. National Academy of Design, New York
