= Walter Merchant House =

Historic house in New York, United States

- U.S. National Register of Historic Places
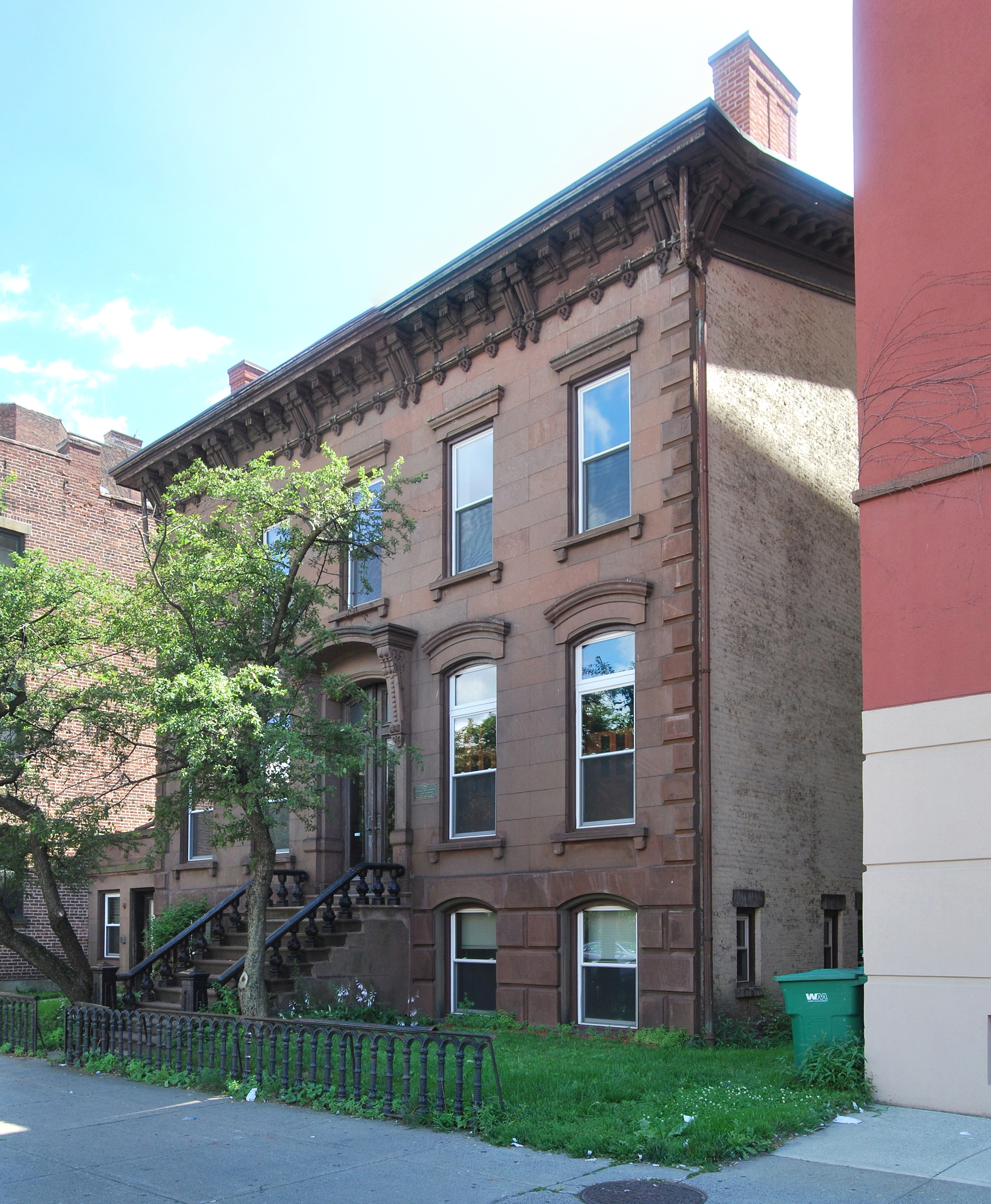
- North elevation and partial west profile, 2011

- Location within New York Location within the United States
- Interactive map showing the Walter Merchant’s house location
- Location: Albany, NY
- Coordinates: 42°39′22″N 73°45′46″W
- Area: less than one acre
- Built: 1869
- Architectural style: Italianate, Renaissance Revival
- NRHP reference No.: 02000137
- Added to NRHP: March 6, 2002

The Walter Merchant House, on Washington Avenue (New York State Route 5) in Albany, New York, United States, is a brick-and-stone townhouse in the Italianate architectural style, with some Renaissance Revival elements. Built in the mid-19th century, it was listed on the National Register of Historic Places in 2002.

At the time of its construction it was surrounded by many similar houses, but it is now one of the rare remaining examples in the city of a townhouse with a surviving rear carriage house. It is one of the only remaining originally residential buildings on that section of Washington, currently used as the main offices of the New York chapter of the National Association of Social Workers.

== Buildings and grounds ==
The house is on the south side of Washington between Lark (U.S. Route 9W) and Dove streets, two blocks west of the tall Alfred E. Smith State Office Building and the New York State Capitol, a National Historic Landmark. It is surrounded by larger commercial and institutional buildings, some more modern, in its densely developed urban neighborhood. The largest building in the vicinity, the Washington Avenue Armory, also on the Register, is across the street to the north, next to a branch of the city library. At Washington and Dove are two other listed properties, the University Club of Albany building and the former Harmanus Bleecker Library. A large parking garage is on the west; smaller commercial buildings line Washington to the east. To the south, the buildings on Spring Street are part of the large Center Square/Hudson–Park Historic District.

=== Exterior ===
A finely detailed cast iron fence and gate, a contributing object to the house's historic character, sets off the sidewalk from the building's shallow front lawn. From the gate a balustraded brownstone stoop rises to the main entrance of the two-story five-bay structure with raised basement. It is made of brick laid in common bond with a brownstone facade on the north (front) side and topped by a gently pitched gabled roof. Two brick chimneys with recessed panels pierce it near either end.

On the basement level the brownstone blocks are rusticated with beveled edges. This treatment is continued in the quoins at the corners. All the other blocks in the facade are smooth and flush.

All the basement windows are one-over-one double-hung sash in segmental-arched openings. Above them the similar first-story windows have an additional segmental-arched lintel as well along with a small sill. In the center is the main entrance, recessed in another segmental arch. It has a carved stone cornice on brackets with rinceau and bead decorative patterns.

Above it the second-story windows are one-over-one with a flat top. They, too, have flat stone sills and decorative lintels. At the roofline is an elaborate bracketed and modillioned overhanging cornice.

The cornice continues along the east and west sides of the house. It has four narrow windows at the basement level, a stained-glass oval window depicting the Merchant family crest in the first story, a single central window on the second story and an arched one at the attic level. At the southwest corner is a small wood-frame addition. The east side has a larger addition, a single story office wing. There is a single window on each of the upper two stories. The south facade has many different additions, some of which are enclosed porches.

=== Interior ===
Two arched wooden doors with glazed panels open into a vestibule with panelled walls and a tiled floor. A second set of doors open into the central hall of the double-pile plan interior. It is dominated by the main staircase, finely crafted with a carved newel and balustrade. The plaster ceiling has a cornice.

To the east are two large parlors, both also with cornices on their plaster ceilings, wooden architraves and large marble mantelpieces. The original wooden shutters are still on the windows. Doors and moldings are painted to match the plaster.

The rooms to the west are decorated very differently, with dark stained wainscoting going midway up the walls. Their fireplaces have wooden mantels, tilework and wooden overmantels. Intersecting polished dark wooden beams and panels create a coffered ceiling. In the rear the windows have several stained glass panels. South of the main hall is a kitchen that has been expanded through the enclosure of some of the original porches.

Upstairs the rooms echo the first-floor layout. Each side has two large chambers connected by a small dressing room, each with closet and a small sink. Other than a fireplace with marble surround, the rooms are generally plainer than their downstairs counterparts, but the northwest chamber has an elaborate ceiling cornice. A small chamber is at the north end of the central hall with a larger bathroom with modern fixtures at the south end. The basement was extensively remodeled in the early 20th century, and no original features remain there.

=== Carriage house ===
A yard, now mostly filled by a parking lot, separates the house from the carriage house, a two-story seven-bay brick building that fronts on Spring Street. The north (rear) facade, which faces the rear of the house, has irregular fenestration with a variety of double-hung sash window patterns, from six-over-six to one-over-one. Its main feature is an enclosed porch on the second story.

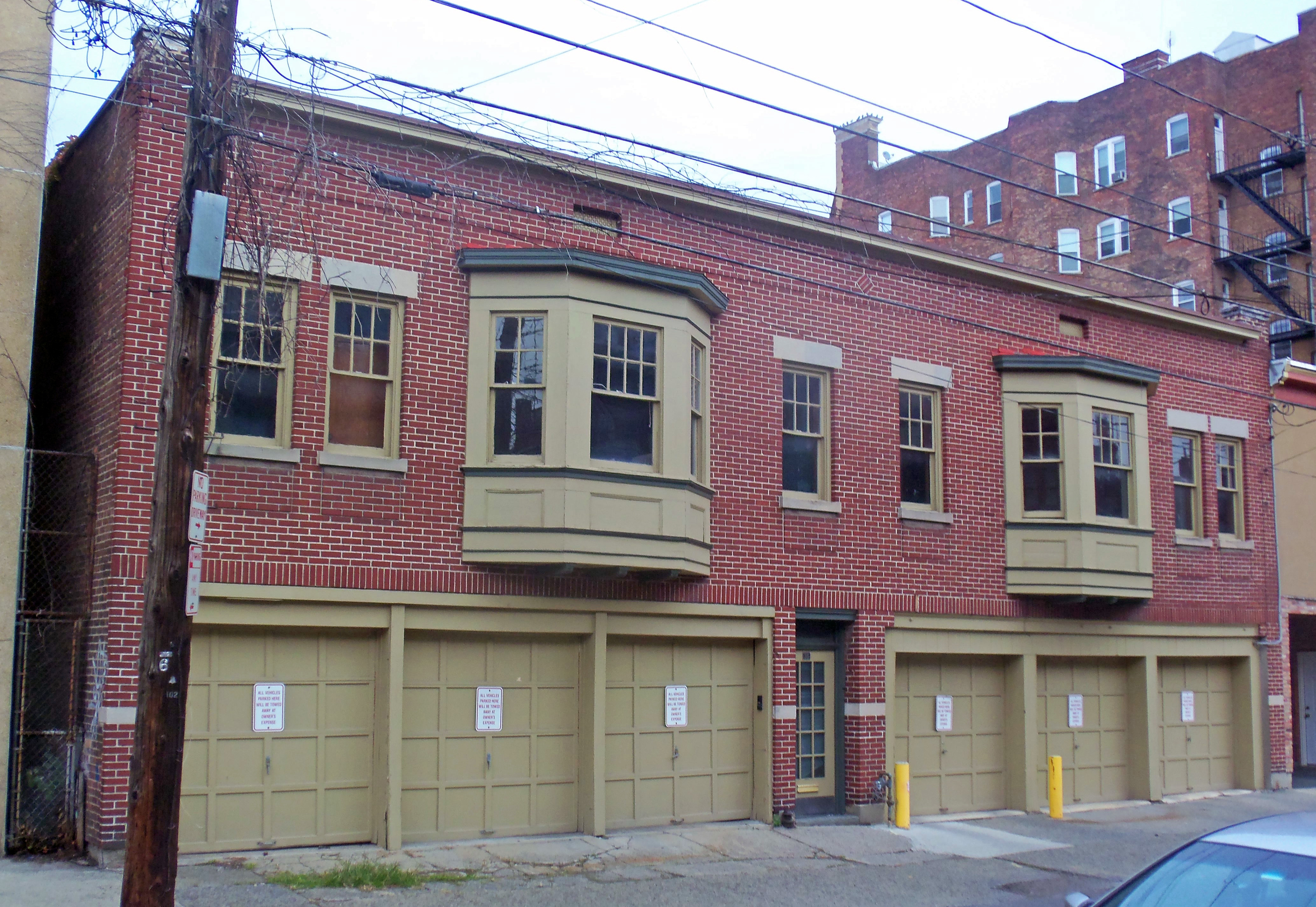
South facade of carriage house

The south facade appears to have been modified at some time since its construction along Queen Anne-Colonial Revival lines. Its brick is red with mortar joints. Along the street are six garage doors interrupted by the main door in the fourth bay. The second story has two bay windows. Both they and the other windows are set with six-over-one double-hung sash.

On the inside, a main hall divides the garage bays into three on each side. They are open and unpartitioned. Portions of the original steam heating system remain. Upstairs there are many small rooms connected by narrow hallways. All are done with polished oak. Some have built-in cabinets with glazed doors.

== History ==
In the 1860s, when Merchant acquired the first of two parcels he would combine to build the house on, Albany was feeling the effects of the rapid growth brought on by the completion of the Erie Canal four decades earlier. Its population had increased almost sixfold. Most new inhabitants were immigrants, who settled in the old Dutch colonial core of the city and then spilled over from it to the south, into neighborhoods like the Pastures, Mansion District and South End.

Some of those made wealthy by this prosperity began settling to the west of this area, on the higher ground where their houses could overlook the city and the Hudson River. The first major house in the Merchants' future neighborhood was the Samuel Hill mansion, today home to the Fort Orange Club, built around 1810. By the 1830s more large houses would be built opposite and rowhouses owned by the affluent lined many of the streets in the neighborhood.

Merchant owned the rowhouse at 186 Washington as of the Civil War. Afterwards he bought the neighboring lot and demolished both houses. The house he built exemplifies in its basic rectangular form, minor classical details and low pitched roof the kind of Italianate urban house in style during that period, the height of the style. More specific Italianate features are the five-bay plan, entrance detailing and decorative cornice. The tightly fit brownstone blocks on the front show the influence of the rising Renaissance Revival style.

It is believed that the carriage house was built at the same time. Sometime around 1900, its south facade was remodeled in the contemporary Queen Anne style, with hints of the emerging Colonial Revival mode. At the same time renovations were made to the interior of the house, in particular the basement. At the end of the 20th century, the social workers' association acquired the house and remodeled it to serve as their state headquarters.

== See also ==
- National Register of Historic Places listings in Albany, New York
