= George Rogers Howell =

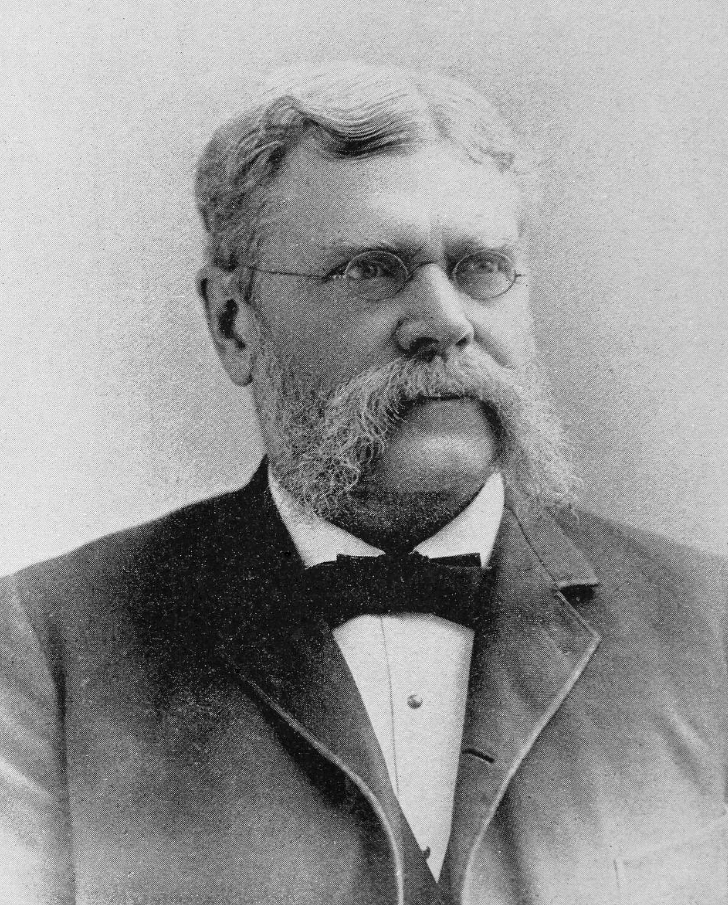
- Born: June 15, 1833; Southampton, New York
- Died: April 5, 1899 (aged 65); Albany, New York
- Education: Yale College; Princeton Theological Seminary
- Occupations: Historian, genealogist, writer
- Spouse: Mary Catherine Seymour (m. 1868)
- Children: 1

George Rogers Howell (June 15, 1833 - April 5, 1899) was an American historian, genealogist, and science fiction writer.

== Biography ==
George Rogers Howell was born in Southampton, New York on June 15, 1833.

A graduate of Yale College (1854), he received the M.A. from Yale University in 1885. He entered Princeton Theological Seminary in 1861 and served briefly as a Presbyterian minister. In 1872 he was appointed Assistant Librarian of the New York State Library in Albany. He also served as secretary of the Albany Institute for 15 years.

He married Mary Catherine Seymour on August 18, 1868, and they had one son.

George Rogers Howell died from pneumonia at his home in Albany on April 5, 1899.

== Works ==
- The Early History of Southampton L. I., New York, with Genealogies (1866)
- Who Opened the Ports of Japan? (Albany, 1876)
- A partial genealogy of the descendants of Samuel Parsons, of East Hampton, L.I., 1650 : constructed, mainly from town and church records (1879)
- Biographical sketch of Joel Munsell (1880)
- Heraldry in the New Capitol at Albany, N.Y. (1881)
- When Southampton and Southold, on Long Island, were settled (1882)
- Heraldry in England and America: Read Before the Albany Institute, January 21, 1884
- Linguistic Discussion: A Paper Read Before the Albany Institute
- Bi-centennial History of County of Albany, 1609-1886
- History of the County of Schenectady, N.Y., from 1662 to 1886
- Genealogy of descendants of Thomas Hale of Walton, England, and of Newbury, Mass. (1889)
- Modern Solution of Old Problems: Address Delivered Before the Livingston County Hictorial [sic] Society at Its Nineteenth Annual Meeting Held in Dansville, N. Y., January 15, 1895
- The Date of the Settlement of the Colony of New York (1897)
- Noah's Log Book: How Two Americans Blasted the Ice on Mt. Ararat and Found Noah's Ark and Some Curious Relics (1898)
- Annotated List of the Principal Manuscripts in the New York State Library
