= Washington Avenue Armory =

Arena in New York

- "The Armory"
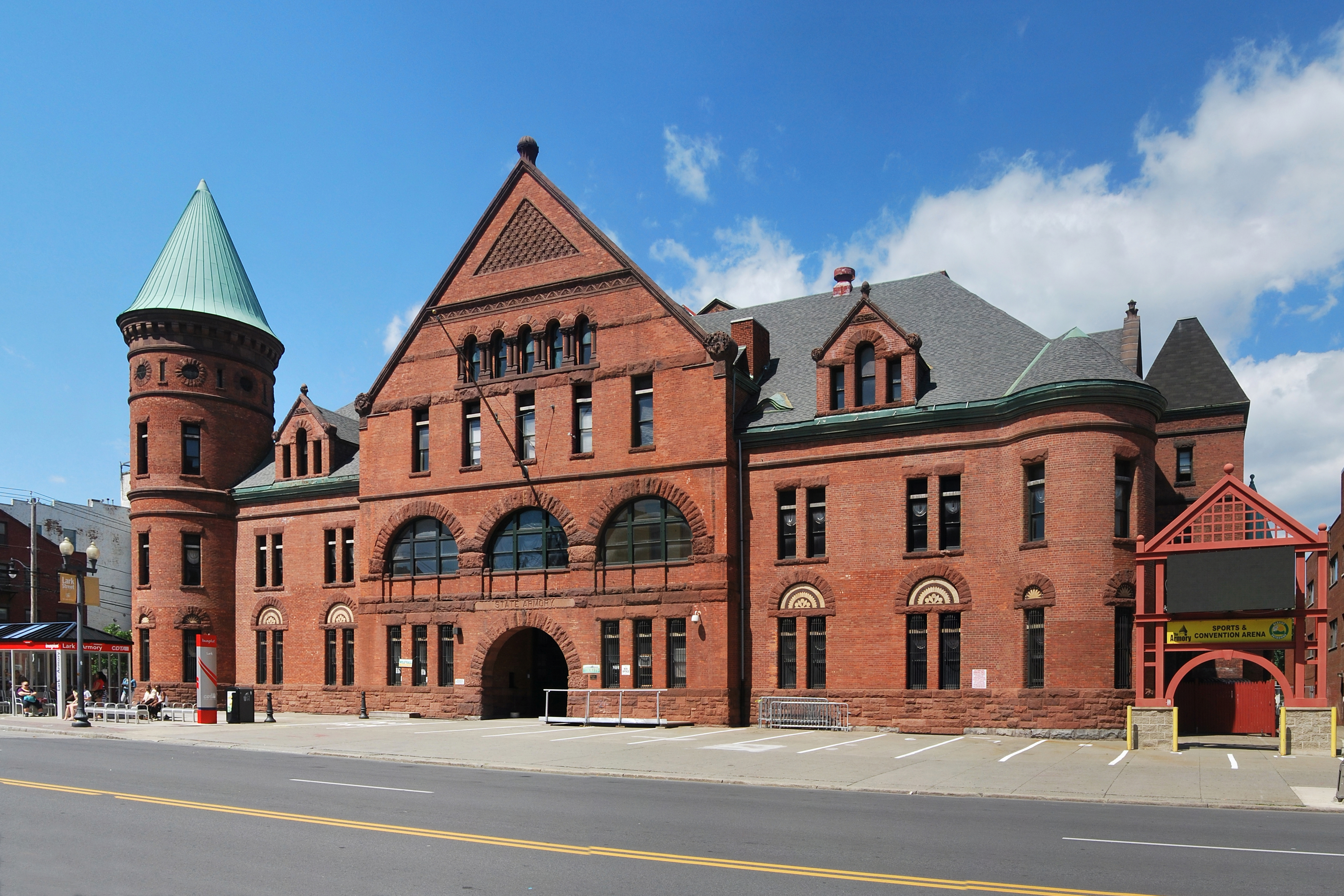
- Interactive map of Washington Avenue Armory
- Full name: Washington Avenue Armory Sports and Convention Arena
- Location: 195 Washington Avenue, Albany, New York, United States 12210
- Coordinates: 42.657081°N 73.762325°W
- Owner: Albany Basketball & Sports Corporation
- Capacity: 3,600–4,300

Construction
- Built: 1890
- Opened: 1890
- Renovated: 1930s
- Architect: Isaac Perry

Tenants
- Albany Patroons (CBA/USBL/TBL) (1982–1990, 2005–2009, 2018–2025); New York Buzz (WTT) (2008)
- Washington Avenue (Tenth Battalion) Armory
- U.S. National Register of Historic Places
- Location within New York Location within the United States
- Area: 1.4 acres (0.6 ha)
- Built: 1889
- Architectural style: Late Victorian, castellated
- MPS: Army National Guard Armories in New York State MPS
- NRHP reference No.: 95000077
- Added to NRHP: March 2, 1995

The Washington Avenue Armory, officially known as the Washington Avenue Armory Sports and Convention Arena and listed on the National Register of Historic Places as Washington Avenue (Tenth Battalion) Armory, is now a multi-purpose arena on the corner of Washington Avenue and Lark Street in downtown Albany, New York. The Armory has a capacity of 4,300 for concerts and conventions and 3,600 for sports events.

== History ==
The Armory was built in 1890 for the Tenth Battalion of the New York National Guard, designed by state architect Isaac Perry. Since the earliest years of professional and collegiate basketball, several college and minor league basketball teams have played in the Armory, as there was no other suitable facility for basketball in the Albany area for many years. The Armory also hosts boxing matches. For many years in the 1960s and 1970s, the armory hosted shows put on by the World Wide Wrestling Federation (WWWF), which were promoted by Vincent J. McMahon. The Friday night cards were always a sellout.

In 1956, the Armory hosted two regular season NBA games. The first was the Fort Wayne Pistons versus the Syracuse Nationals on December 4 and the Minneapolis Lakers versus the Rochester Royals on December 20. Both games failed to bring many fans, with the Lakers and Royals game only selling 1,500 seats.

Between 1982 and 1990, the Armory was home to the Albany Patroons of the Continental Basketball Association. After the Patroons moved to the then-new Knickerbocker Arena, the Armory fell into disuse and was the target of several reuse proposals including becoming the new home of the Albany Library System (whose main branch is next door to the Armory). The Armory was listed on the National Register of Historic Places on March 2, 1995.

In 2004, Albany Basketball & Sports Corporation bought the Armory and the renovated facility opened in September 2005, later that year becoming the home for a reincarnated Patroons. In 2006, the CBA Patroons were joined by the former Pennsylvania ValleyDawgs of the USBL though their first home game as the USBL Patroons did not take place until 2007. It also became home to the New York Buzz of World TeamTennis prior to their 2008 season.

On December 15, 2007, the Armory had to cancel a concert of the rock band Brand New because the roof began to cave in.

== Facilities and management ==
Armory logo

The Armory has 38,000 square feet (3,500 m^{2}) of floor space, meeting facilities, and two video screens. Its website states that it will soon open an underground mall featuring stores and eateries.

Michael Corts is the Armory's general manager. Former Albany County Executive James Coyne served as general manager from 2005 to 2009. Jay Baron replaced Jim Coyne.

== See also ==
- Lark Street
- National Register of Historic Places listings in Albany, New York
