= John Van Buren (disambiguation) =

John Van Buren (1810–1866) was an American politician, and son of President Martin Van Buren. John Van Buren may also refer to:

- John Van Buren (congressman) (1799–1855), U.S. congressman from New York
- John D. Van Buren (1811–1885), New York assemblyman
- John D. Van Buren Jr. (1838–1918), New York engineer and politician
- John J. Van Buren, US Navy officer and pilot

== See also ==
- USS John J. Van Buren (DE-753), a US Navy destroyer escort
- USS Van Buren, two ships
