= Ray Cyr =

Canadian ice hockey player

- Born: December 26, 1933 (age 91); Campbellton, NB, CAN
- Height: 5 ft 10 in (178 cm)
- Weight: 160 lb (73 kg; 11 st 6 lb)
- Position: Center
- Shot: Left
- Played for: Rochester Americans; Providence Reds; Port Huron Flags; San Francisco Seals; Vancouver Canucks
- Playing career: 1950–1971

Raymond Gerald Cyr (born December 26, 1933) is a Canadian former professional hockey player who played for the Rochester Americans and Providence Reds in the American Hockey League. He also played for the Port Huron Flags in the International Hockey League, and 697 games in the Western Hockey League for the San Francisco Seals and Vancouver Canucks.
