= Thomas W. Olcott =

American banker (1795-1880)

President of the Mechanics' and Farmers' Bank of Albany
- In office 1836–1880
- Preceded by: Ezra Ames
- Succeeded by: Dudley Olcott

Personal details
- Born: Thomas Worth Olcott; May 22, 1795 Hudson, New York
- Died: March 23, 1880 (aged 84) Albany, New York
- Spouse: Caroline Dwight Pepoon (m. 1818; died 1867)
- Relations: Gorham A. Worth (uncle)
- Children: 11, including Frederic
- Parent(s): Josiah Olcott; Deborah Worth Olcott

Thomas Worth Olcott (May 22, 1795 – March 23, 1880) was an American banker who served as president of the Mechanics' and Farmers' Bank of Albany, an institution he was connected with for 69 years.

== Early life ==
Olcott was born on May 22, 1795, in Hudson, New York. He was the eldest child of Josiah Olcott (1760–1860) and Deborah (née Worth) Olcott (1773–1846). His father was born in Stratford, Connecticut and his mother was born in Nantucket. Among his siblings were younger brothers Theodore Olcott and Horatio Josiah Olcott, president of the Cherry Valley Bank. Among his extended family was uncle Gorham A. Worth, president of City National Bank from 1844 and 1856.

He was educated in the schools in Hudson before beginning his career as a clerk in the Columbia Bank of Hudson.

== Career ==
After two years as a clerk in the Columbia Bank of Hudson, he was given a clerkship in the Mechanics' and Farmers' Bank of Albany when it was formed on July 29, 1811, as the third bank incorporated in Albany, New York. In 1817 he became cashier, and in June 1836, he was made fifth president of the bank. (Note: The Mechanics' and Farmers' Bank of Albany's first charter expired in 1833 and the second charter expired in 1853, upon which the bank closed up its affairs and the stockholders received 115% besides their stock in the new bank, which renewed the charter for twenty years and went into operation again with the same officers. During the Civil War, the bank closed up its affairs and organized in 1865 under the National Bank Act, having previously operated as a state bank. In 1868, the bank again was chartered under state banking laws, abandoning the national system.) In 1855, the Mechanics' and Farmers' Savings Bank was incorporated with Olcott as the first president. While at the bank, he helped the Erie Canal by furnishing $100,000 for its use. Upon his death, he was succeeded as president by his son Dudley.

Olcott also served as president of the Albany and West Stockbridge Railroad Co. (which later merged into the Boston and Albany Railroad), and was a trustee of the Sinking Fund Commission which was appointed to settle the bonds issued by the city of Albany to fund the construction of the railroad.

=== Political career ===
In early life, and up to 1860, Olcott was a Democrat and member of the Albany Regency instituted by Martin Van Buren. After 1860 and for the remainder of his life he was a Republican. He ran for Congress once but was defeated.

In 1863, while Abraham Lincoln was president, Secretary of the Treasury Salmon Chase offered him the position as the first Controller of the Currency which he declined. He also refused the nomination for New York State Controller, which his youngest son held from 1877 to 1879.

=== Philanthropy ===
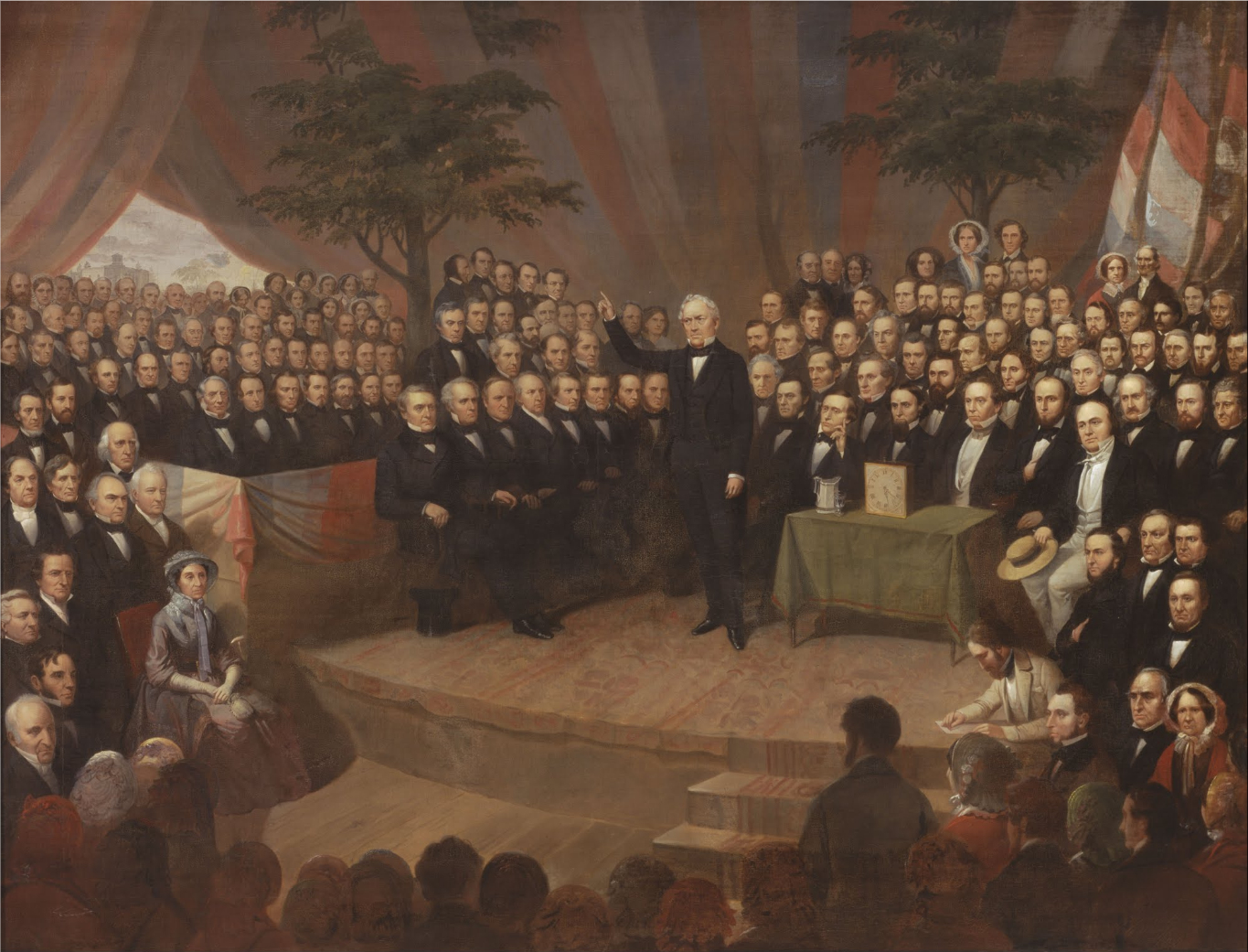
Dudley Observatory Dedication on August 28, 1856, by Tompkins Harrison Matteson. Olcott is seated directly behind (to the left) of Mrs. Dudley

In 1851, he became vice-president of the first board of directors of Albany Law School, the fourth school of its kind organized in the United States. In 1855, he was elected president of the board and continued in that role until his death in 1880. He served as president of the first board of directors of Dudley Observatory, a scientific institution named after Charles E. Dudley that was funded by his widow, Blandina Bleecker Dudley, and to which Olcott and his sons donated the Olcott Meridian Circle. He was also president of the Albany Agricultural and Arts Association, president of Albany Hospital, trustee and president of Albany Academy for Girls, trustee of The Albany Academy, and president of Albany Cemetery Association.

== Personal life ==
On August 17, 1818, Olcott was married to Caroline Dwight Pepoon (1797–1867), the daughter of Elizabeth (née James) Pepoon and Daniel Pepoon of Pittsfield, Massachusetts. Together, they had a well known mansion on Ten Broeck Street in Albany and were the parents of eleven children, including:

- Thomas Worth Olcott Jr. (1821–1873), who married Lucia Marvin Fowler in 1844. After her death in 1850, he married Harriet M. Leonard in 1853. After her death in 1861, he married Emeline McClure (1839–1909) in 1863.
- John Josiah Olcott (1823–1899), who died unmarried.
- Robert Olcott (1824–1859), who died unmarried.
- Mary Marvin Olcott (1826–1892), who died unmarried.
- Theodore Olcott (1828–1907), who married Ann Hazleton Maynard in 1856.
- Alexander Olcott (1829–1887), who married Catherine Amanda Mallory in 1856.
- Dudley Olcott (1838–1919), who also served as president of the Mechanics' and Farmers' Bank of Albany but did not marry.
- Frederic Pepoon Olcott (1841–1909), who married Mary Esmay, a daughter of Isaac Esmay.

Olcott's wife died on March 12, 1867. He died on March 23, 1880, in Albany and was buried in the Albany Rural Cemetery in Menands, New York.

=== Descendants and legacy ===
Through his eldest son Thomas, he was a grandfather of Thomas Worth Olcott III (1856–1938), who served as Secretary and Treasurer of Union Railway Co.

In 1856, he had a large home constructed in the Italianate style for himself and his family. During the 1860s, the residence was extensively remodeled by Robert L. Johnson, its second owner. Samuel Tilden became the first governor to reside in the house when he rented it in 1875, and the state purchased it two years later. Today, his Albany home is known as the New York State Executive Mansion and is the official residence of the governor of New York.
