= Frederic P. Olcott =

American banker and politician (1841-1909)

Frederic Pepoon Olcott
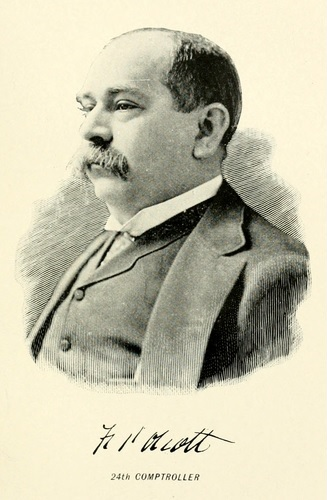
- Frederic P. Olcott, businessman and New York State Comptroller

24th New York State Comptroller
- In office 1877–1879
- Preceded by: Lucius Robinson
- Succeeded by: James Wolcott Wadsworth

Personal details
- Born: February 23, 1841 Albany, New York, U.S.
- Died: April 15, 1909 (aged 68) Bernardsville, New Jersey, U.S.
- Resting place: Albany Rural Cemetery
- Party: Republican
- Other political affiliations: Democrat (1877-1896)
- Relations: Dudley Olcott (brother)
- Education: The Albany Academy

Frederic Pepoon Olcott (February 23, 1841, in Albany, Albany County, New York – April 15, 1909, in Bernardsville, Somerset County, New Jersey) was an American banker and politician.

== Early life ==
Olcott was born on February 23, 1841, in Albany, New York. He was the eleventh and last child of Thomas Worth Olcott (1795–1880) and Caroline Dwight (née Pepoon) Olcott (1797–1867). His father, as well as his elder brother Dudley, served as President of the Mechanics' and Farmers' and the Mechanics' and Farmers' Savings Bank of Albany.

He was educated at The Albany Academy, and then began working at his father's bank. After leaving the bank, he joined the lumber firm of Bissell, Fassett & Co.

== Career ==
In 1866, he relocated to New York City and became a stockbroker in Wall Street.

On January 1, 1877, he was appointed New York State Comptroller to serve for the remainder of the unexpired term of Lucius Robinson who had been elected Governor. At the New York state election, 1877, he was elected on the Democratic, German-American Independent and Bread-Winners' League tickets to succeed himself, and remained in office until the end of 1879. He was defeated for re-election at the New York state election, 1879.

From 1884 to 1905, he was President of the Central Trust Company of New York, which after mergers and acquisitions found its way into the JPMorgan Chase company. In this capacity he was involved in the re-organization of many railroads in financial trouble, like the Philadelphia and Reading Railroad, the Brooklyn Elevated Railroad, the Third Avenue Railroad, and the Toledo, St. Louis and Kansas City Railroad. He also was a director of the Delaware, Lackawanna and Western Railroad.

In 1896, because of his opposition to William Jennings Bryan whom he accused of trying to destroy the American economy, he became a Republican and was a delegate from New Jersey to the 1900 Republican National Convention.

== Personal life ==
Olcott was married to Mary Esmay, a daughter of Isaac Esmay and Eliza (née Angus) Esmay. Together, they had two children, a son and a daughter:

- Edith Olcott (1870–1953), who married Barend van Gerbig.
- Dudley Olcott II (1874–1946), who married Sarah Lewis (née Crozer) Howard in 1903. They divorced in 1932 and he married Leontine "Leo" Marie Berry (1883–1981). His first wife later married Prince Basil Narischkine.

After suffering from heart trouble and chronic Bright's disease, he died at his farm in Bernardsville, New Jersey. He was buried at Albany Rural Cemetery, Section 53, Lot 12.

=== Descendants ===
Through his daughter Edith, he was a grandfather of Howell Van Gerbig (1902–1965), who married four times, including to Geraldine Livingston Thompson and Dorothy Randolph Fell, (Note: Dorothy Randolph Fell (1912–1945), was a daughter of John Ruckman Fell II (1890–1933) and Dorothy Randolph (1889–1968). After Dorothy's parents divorced, her mother married U.S. Representative Ogden Livingston Mills (who later became U.S. Secretary of the Treasury) in 1924 and her father married Mildred Santery in 1925, and Martha Ederton, a former Ziegfeld Follies showgirl, in 1932 (shortly before his death in the East Indies in 1933). Her maternal grandmother, Sarah Rozet (née Drexel) (a daughter of Anthony Joseph Drexel), married Alexander Van Rensselaer following the death of her paternal grandfather.) and was the mother of Howell John "Mickey" van Gerbig (1941–2006), and Barend "Barry" van Gerbig (b. 1939), best known as the owner of the NHL's California Seals.

Through his son Dudley, he was a grandfather of Jeanne "Jean" Grubb Olcott, who married George M. Owens, and Gladys Grubb Olcott (1904–1978), who married French soldier and diplomat, Jean de Pendril Waddington, in 1922. They divorced in 1932, and she married Count Josef Graf von Ledebur-Wicheln a month later. They also divorced.

Political offices
| Preceded by Lucius Robinson | New York State Comptroller; 1877–1879 | Succeeded by James Wolcott Wadsworth |
