= Mechanics' and Farmers' Bank of Albany =

Subsidiary of the Bank of New York

The Mechanics' and Farmers' Bank of Albany was a state and national bank that became a subsidiary of the Bank of New York in 1969.

== History ==
The Mechanics' and Farmers' Bank of Albany was formed on July 29, 1811, as the third bank incorporated in Albany, New York by the 34th New York State Legislature. Its first president was Solomon Southwick, the newspaper publisher and political figure who was a principal organizer of the Anti-Masonic Party. Among its early officers were Gorham A. Worth, who served as cashier (later becoming president of City National Bank). (Note: The first directors named in the act were: Benjamin Knower, John Bryan, Elisha Dorr, Solomon Southwick, Spencer Stafford, Isaac Denniston, Benjamin van Benthuysen, William Fowler, George Merchant, Thomas Lennington, Giles W. Porter, Willard Walker, and Walter Weed.) The bank's first charter expired in 1833 and the second charter expired in 1853, upon which the bank closed up its affairs and the stockholders received 115% besides their stock in the new bank, which renewed the charter for twenty years and went into operation again with the same officers. In 1834, president Benjamin Knower, who had been president since 1817, was forced to resign because of "financial embarrassments." He was succeeded by Charles E. Dudley as president pro tem on February 3, 1834. until Ezra Ames was elected president in June 1834. In June 1836, Thomas W. Olcott became the fifth president of the bank.

During the Civil War, the bank closed up its affairs and organized in 1865 under the National Bank Act, having previously operated as a state bank. In 1868, the bank again was chartered under state banking laws, abandoning the national system. Between 1874 and 1875, the Mechanics' and Farmers' Bank building, designed by Russell Sturgis, was built at State and James Streets in Albany.

Upon Olcott's 1880 death, he was succeeded as president by his son Dudley Olcott. Dudley Olcott served as president until his death in 1919. Upon his death, he was succeeded by his nephew, Robert Olcott in 1920.

In 1943, the bank was admitted into the Federal Reserve System almost simultaneously to the bank being covered by the Federal Deposit Insurance Corporation. At the time, it had total assets of about $7,500,000 and was run by Robert Olcott. In 1946, Robert Olcott retired as president, becoming chairman of the board. He was succeeded as president by his nephew, Douglas W. Olcott. In January 1952, the stockholders of the bank voted to increase capitalization from $250,000 to $500,000 and authorized a 100% stock dividend plus a ten-to-one stock split.

In 1968, the bank agreed to join the proposed bank holding company being formed by the Bank of New York and the County Trust Company of White Plains. At the time, the bank had assets of about $30,000,000. Under the plan, each share of Mechanics' and Farmers' would be exchanged for one quarter of a share in the holding company, plus $67.50 principal amount of 6 and a quarter per cent convertible debentures (which would be convertible into holding company common stock at the rate of one share for every $75 worth of debentures held). The holding company was created in 1969 and the bank became a subsidiary of the Bank of New York. Upon the reorganization, president Douglas W. Olcott retired as president of the bank.

In 1971, the Bank of New York announced the merger of the Tanners National Bank of Catskill, N.Y. (which had assets of $10.4 million at the end of 1970), into the Mechanics and Farmers' Bank of Albany. In the merger, shareholders of Tanners received 2.75 shares of Bank of New York common for each Tanners share for a total of 41,250 Bank of New York shares.

=== List of presidents ===
- Solomon Southwick (1811–1813)
- Isaac Hutton (1813–1817)
- Benjamin Knower (1817–1834)
- Charles E. Dudley (1834–1834; as president pro tem)
- Ezra Ames (1834–1836)
- Thomas W. Olcott (1836–1880)
- Dudley Olcott (1880–1919)
- Robert Olcott (1920–1946)
- Douglas W. Olcott (1946–1969)
- Daniel W. Vooys (1970-)

== Mechanics' and Farmers' Savings Bank ==
In 1855, the Mechanics' and Farmers' Savings Bank was incorporated with Thomas W. Olcott as the first president. Like the earlier bank, upon Olcott's 1880 death, his son Dudley became president.

The Mechanics and Farmers Savings Bank, which merged with the Albany Exchange Savings Bank, becoming the Mechanics Exchange Savings Bank. In the 1970s, Mechanics Exchange was acquired by Dime Savings Bank, which was acquired by Washington Mutual in 2002.
