= Knower House =

Historic house in New York, United States

- U.S. National Register of Historic Places
- Location within New York Location within the United States
- Location: 757 NY 146, Altamont, New York
- Coordinates: 42°42′18″N 74°01′11″W
- Area: 1.8 acres (0.73 ha)
- Built: ca. 1800
- Architectural style: Early Republic
- MPS: Guilderland MRA
- NRHP reference No.: 82001073
- Added to NRHP: November 10, 1982

Knower House is a historic home located at Guilderland in Albany County, New York. It was built about 1800 and is a two-story frame house in the Georgian Colonial style. It accentuates a centroidal entrance and second story Palladian window. While occupied by Benjamin Knower, future New York Governor William L. Marcy married Cornelia Knower at the house in 1824.

A historical marker in front of the house states:

"Knower House

Est. as hat factory about 1800

by Benjamin Knower

Gov. William L. Marcy

Married Cornelia Knower

in this house"

It was listed on the National Register of Historic Places in 1982.
