= Shipley Jones =

- Born: 1850
- Died: August 9, 1936 (aged 85–86); New York City, New York, U.S.
- Education: Columbia College
- Parent(s): Samuel T. Jones; Martha M. Jones

Shipley Jones (1850 – August 9, 1936) was an American banker, society leader and clubman who was prominent in New York during the Gilded Age.

== Early life ==
Jones was born in 1850. He was the only surviving son of four children born to Samuel Tonkin Jones and his second wife, Martha Mary (née Thomas) Jones. His siblings included Sarah Margaret Jones, who married Henry Beadel; Samuel T. Jones Jr., who died young; and Elizabeth Ludlow Jones, who married John D. Van Buren Jr. His elder half sister, Frances Mary Jones, was first married to Richard Montgomery Pell (of the Livingston family) and secondly to banker Louis T. Hoyt (son of Jesse Hoyt of Swartwout–Hoyt scandal infamy). His father and uncle, Ludlow Thomas, were with the firm of S. T. Jones & Co.

His uncle, Ludlow Thomas, served as vice president of the Stock Exchange Building Association, and many of his prominent ancestors came to New York from Philadelphia. His maternal grandparents were Philip Thomas and Frances Mary (née Ludlow) Thomas. His paternal grandparents were Isaac Cooper Jones and Hannah (née Firth) Jones (a descendant of Samuel Carpenter, the Deputy Governor of colonial Pennsylvania, and Samuel Preston, mayor of Philadelphia).

Jones graduated from Columbia College in 1869 with a B.A. degree. He also received a M.A. degree from Columbia in 1872.

== Career ==
After graduating from Columbia, Jones joined the New York Stock Exchange on March 24, 1871, becoming a partner in 1889. In 1903, Jones founded Jones & Lanman with partner Jonathan Trumbull Lanman, located at 96 Broadway, and, later, 111 Broadway. The firm specialized in commission stock and were bond brokers for many years. In 1923, Jones was recognized as having been a member of the Exchange for over 40 years. In 1927, Jones transferred his interest in the firm to Jonathan T. Lanman Jr.

=== Society life ===
In 1892, Jones was included in Ward McAllister's "Four Hundred", purported to be an index of New York's best families, published in The New York Times. Conveniently, 400 was the number of people that could fit into Mrs. Astor's ballroom. Jones was a member of the Metropolitan Club, the Society of Colonial Wars, and served as the treasurer of the Knickerbocker Bowling Club.

== Personal life ==
Jones lived at 125 East 50th Street in New York City. Upon his parents death, he inherited the 26.25 acre family estate in New Brighton, Staten Island known as "The Cedars".

Jones died on August 9, 1936, and was buried at Green-Wood Cemetery in Brooklyn.
