= Harriet Wadsworth Harper =

Virginia equestrian

- Born: October 21, 1881; Newport
- Died: November 2, 1975 (aged 94); Warrenton
- Parent(s): James W. Wadsworth; Maria Louisa Wadsworth
- Relatives: James W. Wadsworth Jr.

Harriet Travers Wadsworth Harper (October 21, 1881 – November 2, 1975) was an American equestrian and foxhunter.

Harriet Travers Wadsworth was born on October 21, 1881 in Newport, Rhode Island. She was the daughter of US Representative James Wolcott Wadsworth and Maria Louisa Travers, daughter of businessman William R. Travers.

She came from a family with a strong background in horse riding and fox hunting; her uncle W. Austin Wadsworth was Master of the Genesee Valley Hunt. She began riding sidesaddle at age five. She was later diagnosed with scoliosis and the doctor suggested ridding sidesaddle facing the offside (right) of the horse, opposite of the customary position. She rode in this fashion the rest of her life.

Growing up, she made frequent visits to her aunt Elizabeth Wadsworth Post in the United Kingdom. On one of those visits, she met a young Eleanor Roosevelt, a friend and classmate of her cousin Nelly Post, and recalled her as “the little American girl who was so homesick."

In 1913, Wadsworth married Fletcher Harper (1874-1963), a polo player who was the grandson of Fletcher Harper. They were engaged while Harper was in the hospital with a broken leg following "a tussle with a fractious horse". They eventually settled in Friendship Farm near The Plains, Virginia. Fletcher Harper was master of the Orange County Hunt from 1920 to 1953. The couple are credited with promoting the sport of foxhunting in the area, working with local landowners to open the land to the sport and popularizing it there among American elites.

In 1930 Harper and her husband were painted by the portrait painter Ellen Emmet Rand. Both portraits were included in Rand's 1936 New York exhibition Sporting Portraits.

In 1966, she published an autobiography, Around the World in Eighty Years on a Sidesaddle.

Harriet Travers Wadsworth Harper died on November 2, 1975, in Warrenton, Virginia.
