= Isaac Hutton =

American silversmith

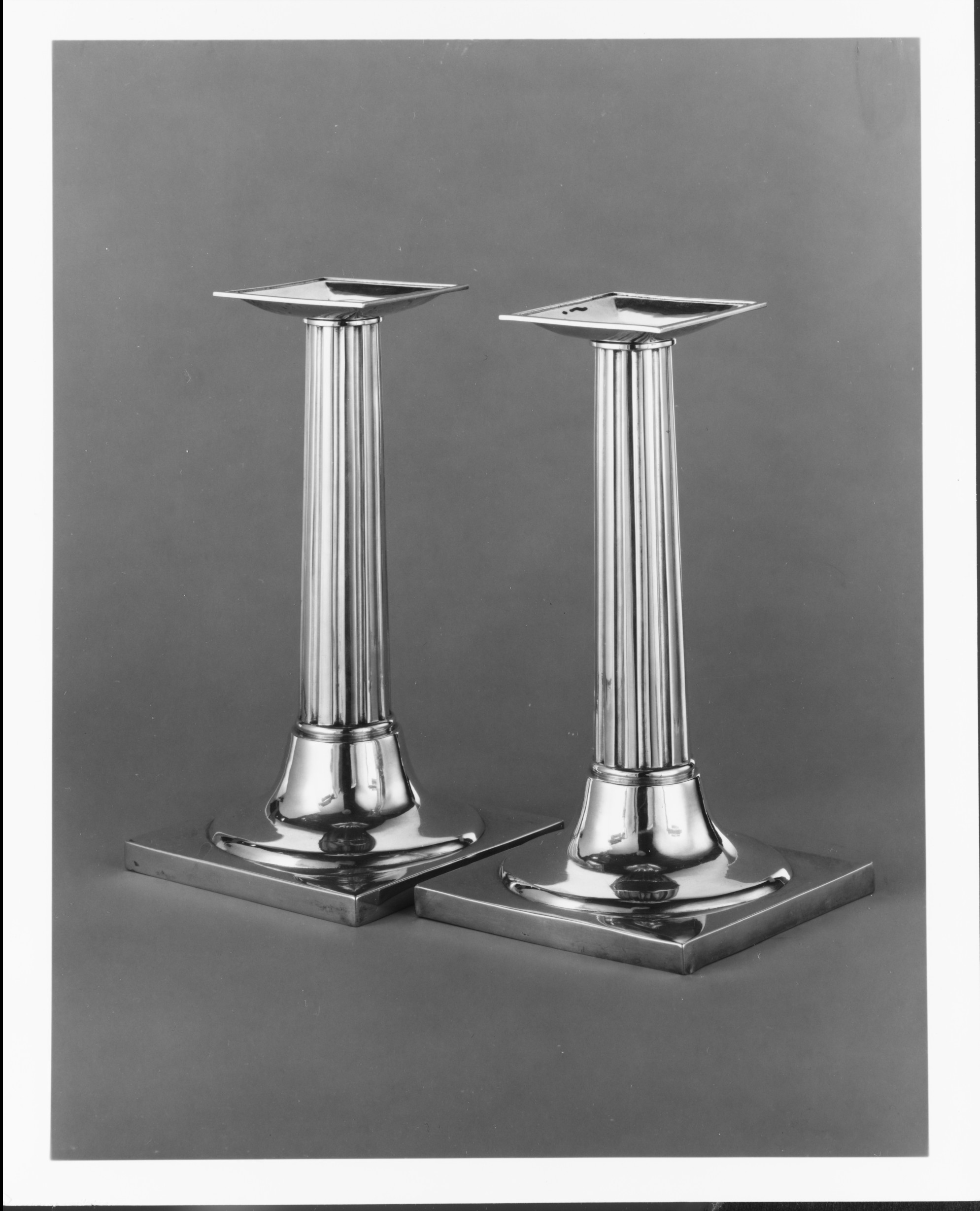
Candlesticks by Isaac Hutton, 1800-1815

Isaac Hutton (before 20 July 1766 – 8 September 1855) was an American silversmith and engraver, active in Albany, New York.

Hutton was born in New York City to George and Anna Viele Hutton, and on July 20, 1766, was baptized into the Dutch Reformed Church. He moved to Albany in the 1780s, where he was probably apprenticed to silversmith John Folsom, with whom he partnered from 1787 to 1790 as Folsom & Hutton. In 1791 he purchased property for his house and shop at 32 Market Street. In 1794 he engraved the Plan of the City of Albany, and in 1798 profiles of members of the House of Assembly. From February 1796 to 1817 he was in partnership with his brother, George Hutton, as I & G HUTTON, and on September 30, 1796, advertised in The Albany Gazette: "Three Silver Smiths, May have constant employ in a very convienent [sic] shop, and recieve [sic] prompt pay, by application immediately to I. & G. HUTTON, No 32, Market Street." They created the seal for Union College, in Schenectady, New York, for which they were paid in November 1796. During the War of 1812, the Huttons sold silver and other items for military use, including silver accoutrements and fittings, gunpowder, regimental drums, and even pianofortes, and sheep wool.

Hutton was an active citizen in Albany. In 1791 he was a member of a fire company, in 1793 was a founding member and treasurer of Albany Mechanics Society, in 1811 served as a founding director of the Mechanics & Farmers Bank, and in 1813 was named president of the bank's board, in which he served until 1817. He was also a director of the Albany Water Works and a founder of the Albany Female Academy. Hutton went bankrupt in 1817 due to speculation in a venture to manufacture cotton goods, and left Albany after a sheriff's sale in 1819. He was listed in census records in 1850 and 1855 as a resident of Stuyvesant, New York, and died in Stuyvesant Landing.

His work is collected in the Metropolitan Museum of Art, New York State Museum, Albany Institute of History and Art, and the Clark Art Institute.
