= James W. Wadsworth =

American politician, farmer and soldier (1846-1926)

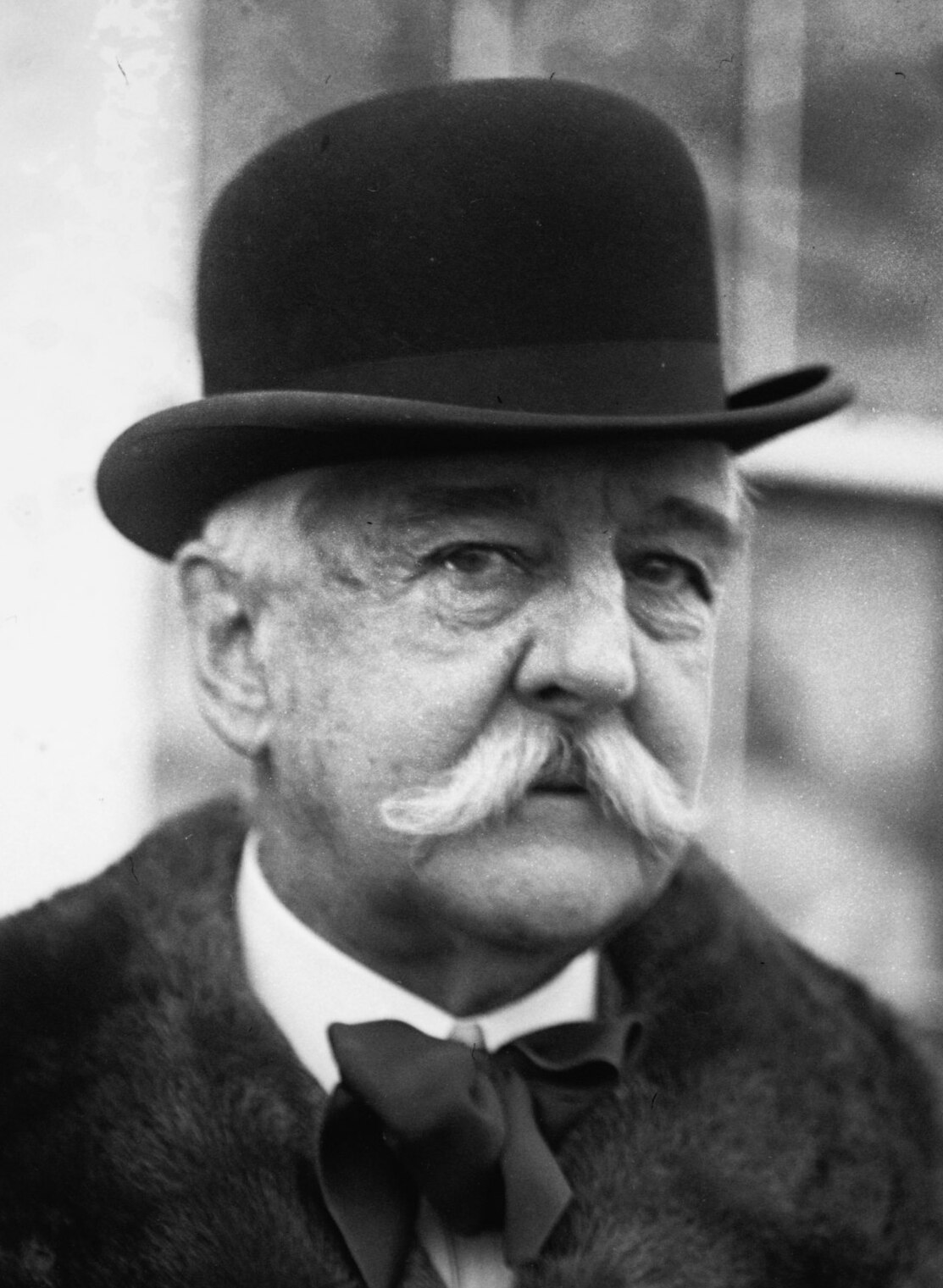
- Wadsworth in 1922

Member of the U.S. House of Representatives from New York
- In office November 8, 1881 – March 3, 1885
- Preceded by: Elbridge G. Lapham
- Succeeded by: Sereno E. Payne
- Constituency: 27th district
- In office March 4, 1891 – March 3, 1907
- Preceded by: John G. Sawyer
- Succeeded by: Peter A. Porter
- Constituency: 31st district (1891–93); 30th district (1893–1903); 34th district (1903–07)

New York State Comptroller
- In office January 1, 1880 – December 31, 1881
- Governor: Alonzo B. Cornell
- Preceded by: Frederic P. Olcott
- Succeeded by: Ira Davenport

Member of the New York State Assembly from Livingston County
- In office January 1, 1878 – December 31, 1879
- Preceded by: Jonathan B. Morey
- Succeeded by: Archibald Kennedy

Personal details
- Born: James Wolcott Wadsworth; October 12, 1846 Philadelphia, Pennsylvania, U.S.
- Died: December 24, 1926 (aged 80) Washington, D.C., U.S.
- Resting place: Temple Hill Cemetery, Geneseo, New York
- Party: Republican
- Spouse: Louise Travers (m. 1876)
- Children: James W. Wadsworth Jr.
- Parent(s): James S. Wadsworth; Mary Craig Wharton
- Education: Hopkins School

Military service
- Allegiance: United States of America; Union
- Branch/service: United States Army; Union Army
- Years of service: 1864–1865
- Rank: Brevet Major
- Battles/wars: American Civil War: Battle of Five Forks

James Wolcott Wadsworth (October 12, 1846 – December 24, 1926) was an American farmer, soldier and statesman.

== Early life ==
Wadsworth was born in Philadelphia to General James Samuel Wadsworth and Mary Craig (née Wharton) Wadsworth. His brothers were Charles Frederick Wadsworth and Craig Wharton Wadsworth, the father of Craig Wharton Wadsworth Jr. His elder sister, Cornelia Wadsworth Ritchie Adair became prominent as matriarch of Glenveagh Castle in County Donegal, Ireland, and the large JA Ranch in the Texas panhandle. His younger sister, Elizabeth S. Wadsworth, married firstly Arthur Post in 1875, and secondly in 1889, as a widow, Arthur Smith-Barry, 1st Baron Barrymore, becoming Lady Barrymore.

His paternal grandfather, James Wadsworth, and his grandfather's brother, William Wadsworth, moved from Durham, Connecticut, and were the original settlers of Geneseo.

He was educated at the Hopkins School in New Haven, Connecticut, preparing to attend Yale, however, he did not attend, instead joining the Army in 1864.

== Career ==
In 1864, Wadsworth joined the Union army and served during the Civil War. On January 24, 1865, he was awarded a brevet major for "gallant and meritorious service at the Battle of Five Forks, Va." He honorably mustered out June 25, 1865.

=== Political career ===
He was a member of the New York State Assembly (Livingston Co.) in 1878 and 1879. He served as the New York State Comptroller from January 1, 1880, to December 31, 1881, elected at the 1879 New York state election.

He was elected to the 47th United States Congress to fill the vacancy caused by the resignation of Elbridge G. Lapham, and re-elected to the 48th United States Congresses, serving from December 5, 1881, to March 3, 1885. In 1885, he ran again for State Comptroller but was defeated by Democrat Alfred C. Chapin.

He ran again in 1890 and was elected the 52nd, 53rd, 54th, 55th, 56th, 57th, 58th and 59th United States Congresses, serving from March 4, 1891, to March 3, 1907. He was talked about as a candidate for Governor of New York, but did not run. In 1906, he was defeated for re-election by Peter A. Porter.

He was a delegate to the 1884 and 1904 Republican National Conventions. He was a delegate to the New York State Constitutional Convention of 1915.

== Personal life ==
On September 14, 1876, he was married to Louise Travers (1848–1931), the daughter of wealthy New York lawyer, William R. Travers, and granddaughter of U.S. Senator and U.S. Minister to the United Kingdom Reverdy Johnson. Together, they were the parents of:

- James Wolcott Wadsworth Jr. (1877–1952), who became a U.S. Senator and married Alice Evelyn Hay, daughter of Secretary of State John Hay.
- Harriet Travers Wadsworth (1881–1975), who married Fletcher Harper, a polo player and fox hunter who was the grandson of Fletcher Harper, in 1913.

Wadsworth died on December 24, 1926, in Washington, D.C. He was buried at the Temple Hill Cemetery in Geneseo, New York. His gravestone reads: "Soldier in the Civil War / Public Servant / Patron of Sport / Farmer all his Days". His widows died in 1931.

=== Descendants ===
His grandson, James Jeremiah Wadsworth (1905–1984), served as United States Ambassador to the United Nations. His granddaughter, Evelyn Wadsworth (1903–1972), married William Stuart Symington Jr. (1901–1988), the first Secretary of the Air Force and a Democratic U.S. Senator from Missouri, who unsuccessfully sought the Democratic presidential nomination in 1960. His great-grandson, James Wadsworth Symington (b. 1927) served in the U.S. House of Representatives from Missouri as a Democrat and his great-great-grandson, William Stuart Symington IV (b. 1952), is currently serving as the United States Ambassador to Nigeria and was the former U.S. Special Representative for the Central African Republic.

=== Legacy and honors ===
He received an honorary A.M. degree from Yale University in 1898.

The Wadsworth Hospital, Theatre and Chapel at the Sawtelle Veterans Home in Los Angeles, are named in his honor.

New York State Assembly
Preceded by Jonathan B. Morey	New York State Assembly; Livingston County; 1878–1879	Succeeded by Archibald Kennedy
Political offices
Preceded by Frederic P. Olcott	New York State Comptroller; 1880–1881	Succeeded by Ira Davenport
U.S. House of Representatives
Preceded by Elbridge G. Lapham	Member of the U.S. House of Representatives from New York's 27th congressional district 1881–1885	Succeeded by Sereno E. Payne
Preceded by John G. Sawyer	Member of the U.S. House of Representatives from New York's 31st congressional district 1891–1893	Succeeded by John Van Voorhis
Preceded by Halbert S. Greenleaf	Member of the U.S. House of Representatives from New York's 30th congressional district 1893–1903	Succeeded by John W. Dwight
Preceded by Edward B. Vreeland	Member of the U.S. House of Representatives from New York's 34th congressional district 1903–1907	Succeeded by Peter A. Porter
Preceded by William H. Hatch	Chairman of the House Agriculture Committee; 1895–1907	Succeeded by Charles F. Scott
