= Nathan D. Wendell =

American journalist

Nathan D. Wendell (1835, Fort Plain, Montgomery County, New York – January 5, 1886, Albany, Albany County, New York) was an American banker and politician.

== Life ==
He first learned the printer's trade, but in 1854 he went to Albany and began to work for the Merchants' National Bank with which he remained until the day of his death, having become Cashier in 1864 and Vice President in 1880.

In 1872, he was elected Treasurer of Albany County. In 1876, he was a presidential elector. He was New York State Treasurer from 1880 to 1881, elected in 1879. He was an alternate delegate to the 1884 Republican National Convention.

At a time, he was one of the co-owners of the Albany Morning Express newspaper.

He was the receiver of the Universal Life Insurance Company of New York City.

== Sources ==
- Obit in NYT on January 6, 1886
- The Universal life receivership, in NYT on April 22, 1882
- Political Graveyard
- Republican nominations, in NYT on September 4, 1879

Political offices
Preceded by James Mackin	New York State Treasurer; 1880–1881	Succeeded by Robert A. Maxwell
