= Horatio Seymour Jr. =

Horatio Seymour, Jr.
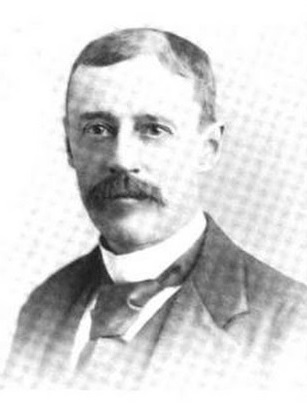
- From 1897's Report of the Trigintennial Meeting of the Yale University Class of 1867

New York State Engineer and Surveyor
- In office January 1, 1878 – December 31, 1881
- Governor: Lucius Robinson; Alonzo B. Cornell
- Preceded by: John D. Van Buren Jr.
- Succeeded by: Silas Seymour

Personal details
- Born: January 8, 1844 Utica, New York, United States
- Died: February 21, 1907 (aged 63) Utica, New York
- Spouse: Abigail Adams Johnson (1855-1915) (m. 1880)
- Relations: Horatio Seymour (uncle)
- Education: Yale University
- Profession: Engineer

Horatio Seymour Jr. (January 8, 1844 – February 21, 1907) was an American civil engineer, surveyor and politician from New York.

== Life ==
He was born on January 8, 1844, in Utica, New York. He was the son of John Forman Seymour (1814–1890, brother of Governor Horatio Seymour) and Frances Antill (Tappan) Seymour (d. 1853). He graduated from Yale College in 1867. He studied law with his father before deciding on a career as an engineer, and he studied at Yale University's Sheffield Scientific School to obtain his professional qualification. In 1871, Seymour received his M.A. from Yale.

He began engineering work with the City Surveyor of Utica, New York, and was on the survey of the Canastota and Cazenovia Railroad in Madison County, New York. In 1871 he became Assistant Engineer of the Seneca Falls and Sodus Bay Railroad, and afterwards was Assistant Engineer of the Wellsboro and Lawrenceville Railroad, and Chief Engineer of the Cowanesque Valley Railroad. In 1873 he made a survey of the Antrim mine of the Fall Brook Coal Co., and in 1874 a topographic survey of the lands of the Buffalo Coal Co. in Pennsylvania.

On December 1, 1874, he was appointed Assistant Engineer on the New York State Canals. He was New York State Engineer and Surveyor from 1878 to 1881, elected on the Democratic ticket in 1877 and 1879. In 1882, he became manager of the Michigan Land and Iron Company properties in Michigan. Later he returned to Utica and continued to work as a general practicing engineer.

He founded the Huron Mountain Club along with John Munro Longyear.

He died in Utica on February 21, 1907.

He was a member of the American Society of Civil Engineers.

== Family ==
On October 12, 1880, he married Abigail Adams Johnson (1855-1915). Their children included daughter Mary and son Horatio.

Mary Ledyard Seymour was 20 when she eloped in 1901 with 65-year-old Henry St. Arnould. After grudging consent from her parents, they married in Marquette, Michigan.

Political offices
Preceded by John D. Van Buren, Jr.	New York State Engineer and Surveyor; 1878 - 1881	Succeeded by Silas Seymour
