= 1877 New York state election =

- November 6, 1877

The 1877 New York state election was held on November 6, 1877, to elect the Secretary of State, the State Comptroller, the Attorney General, the State Treasurer and the State Engineer, as well as all members of the New York State Assembly and the New York State Senate.

== History ==
The Republican state convention met on September 26 and 27 at Rochester, New York. John C. Churchill for Secretary of State, Francis Sylvester for Comptroller, William L. Bostwick for Treasurer, Grenville Tremain for Attorney General, and Howard Soule, Jr., for State Engineer, were nominated unanimously without much debate. Sylvester declined to run, and on October 19, the State Committee substituted Clinton V. R. Ludington for Comptroller on the ticket.

The Working Men's state convention met at Troy, New York, and nominated John J. Junio, of Auburn, for Secretary of State; George Blair for Comptroller; Warren T. Worden for Attorney General; Samuel G. Rice for Treasurer; and Walter T. Griswold for State Engineer.

The Democratic state convention met on October 3 and 4 at Albany, New York. Clarkson N. Potter was president. Allen C. Beach was nominated for Secretary of State on the first ballot (vote: Beach 227, John Bigelow [incumbent] 144, A. B. Weaver 12). The incumbent Comptroller Frederic P. Olcott was re-nominated by acclamation. James Mackin for Treasurer and Augustus Schoonmaker, Jr., for Attorney General, And Horatio Seymour, Jr., for State Engineer were nominated after some haggling and without much voting. Summing up, John Kelly had managed to wrest the power in the Democratic Party from the Tilden-Robinson faction.

The Bread-Winners League's state convention met on October 10 at Albany, New York. Charles H. Truax was president. The convention nominated John J. Junio for Secretary of State, Frederic P. Olcott (Dem.) for Comptroller, Elmore Sharpe for Attorney General, Julius Kern for Treasurer and Horatio Seymour, Jr. (Dem.), for State Engineer.

The German-American Independent Citizens' Committee met on October 12 at Beethoven Hall in New York City. Oswald Ottendorfer presided. The Committee cross-endorsed the following state ticket: Churchill (Rep.) for Secretary of State, Olcott (Dem.) for Comptroller, Bostwick (Rep.) for Treasurer, Tremain (Rep.) for Attorney General and Seymour (Dem.) for State Engineer.

== Results ==
The entire state-wide Democratic ticket was elected.

The incumbent Olcott was re-elected.

1877 state election results
Office	Democratic ticket		Republican ticket		Working Men ticket		Prohibition ticket		Social Democratic ticket		Greenback ticket		German Independent ticket	Bread-Winners ticket
Secretary of State	Allen C. Beach	383,062	John C. Churchill	371,798	John J. Junio	20,282	Henry Hagner	7,230	John McIntosh	1,799	Francis E. Spinner	997	John C. Churchill	John J. Junio
Comptroller	Frederic P. Olcott	395,701	Clinton V. R. Ludington	359,590	George Blair	19,123	Elias T. Talbot	7,444	G. Kuhne	1,271	Thomas B. Edwards	973	Frederic P. Olcott	Frederic P. Olcott
Attorney General	Augustus Schoonmaker, Jr.	383,367	Grenville Tremain	371,826	Warren T. Worden	19,538	G. Havens Gleason	7,291	Ernst Smith	1,348	William S. Jaynes		Grenville Tremain	Elmore Sharpe
Treasurer	James Mackin	384,040	William L. Bostwick	370,383	Samuel G. Rice	18,480	Joseph W. Grosvenor	7,383	R. H. Bartholomew	1,827	William Doyle	920	William L. Bostwick	Julius Kern
State Engineer	Horatio Seymour, Jr.	395,321	Howard Soule	360,157	Walter T. Griswold	19,653	Henry D. Myers	7,386	C. F. Collenburg	1,356	Rushton Smith	881	Horatio Seymour, Jr.	Horatio Seymour, Jr.

The numbers are the total votes on all tickets.

== See also ==
- New York state elections

== Sources ==
- The Tickets: For State Officers New York Times. October 29, 1877 (has Michael F. McKiernan, William S Jaynes, and Rushton Smith on Workingmen's ticket)
- The Vote of Albany New York Times. November 12, 1877
- Results in The Evening Journal Almanac (1878, p. 62)
- Results: The Tribune Almanac 1878
