= Dudley Olcott =

American banker (1838–1919)

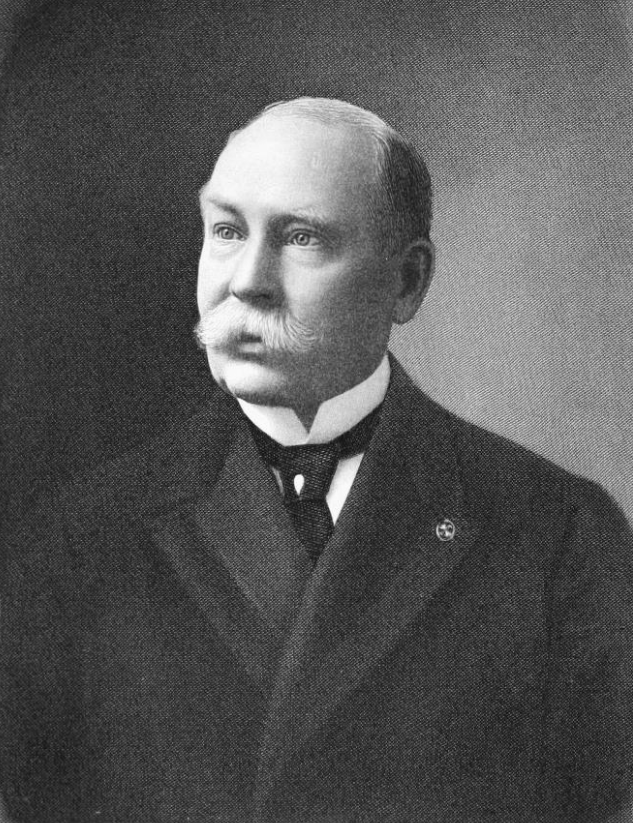

President of the Mechanics' and Farmers' Bank of Albany
- In office 1880–1919
- Preceded by: Thomas W. Olcott
- Succeeded by: Robert Olcott

Personal details
- Born: September 21, 1838 Albany, New York
- Died: December 28, 1919 (aged 81) Albany, New York
- Relations: Frederic P. Olcott (brother)
- Parent(s): Thomas W. Olcott; Caroline Dwight Pepoon
- Education: The Albany Academy
- Alma mater: Rensselaer Polytechnic Institute

Dudley Olcott (September 21, 1838 – December 28, 1919) was an American banker who served as President of the Mechanics' and Farmers' Bank of Albany.

== Early life ==
Olcott was born on February 23, 1841, in Albany, New York. He was the eleventh and last child of Thomas Worth Olcott (1795–1880) and Caroline Dwight (née Pepoon) Olcott (1797–1867). His father served as President of the Mechanics' and Farmers' and the Mechanics' and Farmers' Savings Bank of Albany. Among his siblings was brother Frederic P. Olcott, the 24th New York State Comptroller.

He was educated at The Albany Academy, before attending the Rensselaer Polytechnic Institute, where he studied civil engineering.

== Career ==
After graduating from the Rensselaer Polytechnic Institute in 1858, he became an accountant in the Mechanics' and Farmers' Bank of Albany, of which his father had been president since 1836. The younger Olcott became assistant cashier, followed by cashier for thirteen years until he was chosen as vice president of the bank on December 31, 1878. Upon his father's death, he was elected president of the Bank in March 1880. Olcott served as president until his own death in 1919 when he was succeeded as president by his nephew, Robert Olcott (son of his brother Thomas Worth Olcott Jr.).

In 1867, he was appointed Paymaster General by fellow Republican governor Reuben Fenton, serving until 1869. Olcott also served as president of the Albany Bankers' Association and a trustee of the Central Trust Company of New York. He was a member of the board of governors of the Albany Hospital, trustee of Home for Aged Men, a trustee of Albany Orphan Asylum, and a trustee of the Albany Academy for Girls.

== Personal life ==
Olcott spent his vacation salmon fishing on the Restigouche River in Canada for over thirty years. He died in Albany on December 28, 1919. He was buried at the Albany Rural Cemetery of which he had been president and treasurer of the Albany Cemetery Association.

Although he did not have any children, his brother Frederic named his son, Dudley Olcott II (1874–1946), the prominent banker, after him. Dudley Olcott II, a horse trotter, also purchased the Herald Square Hotel for over $1,000,000 in 1913.
