= 1879 New York state election =

1879 New York gubernatorial election
- November 4, 1879
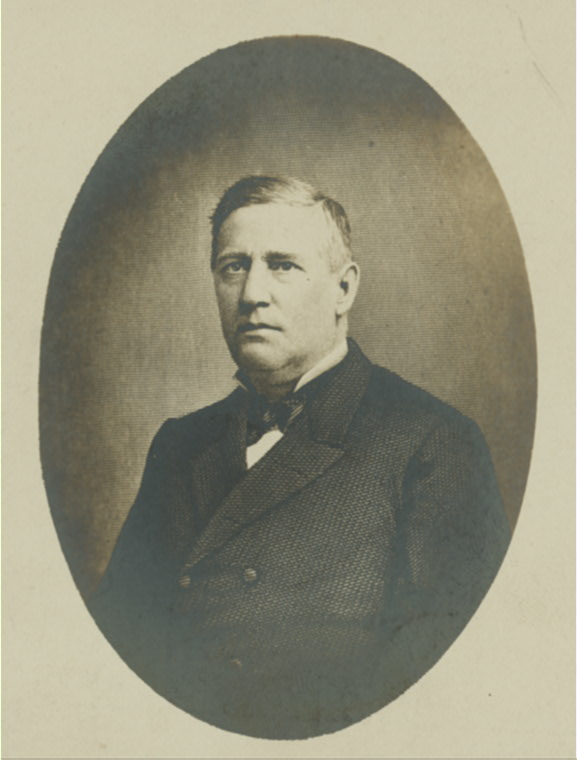

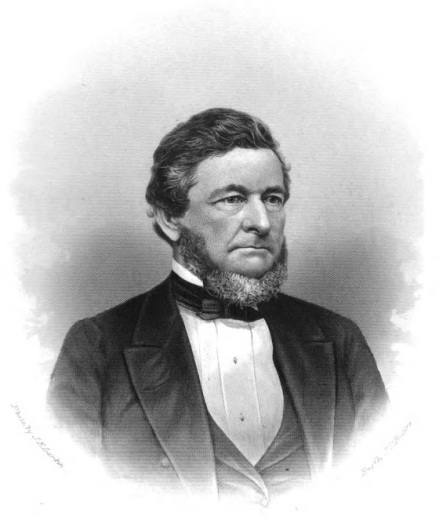

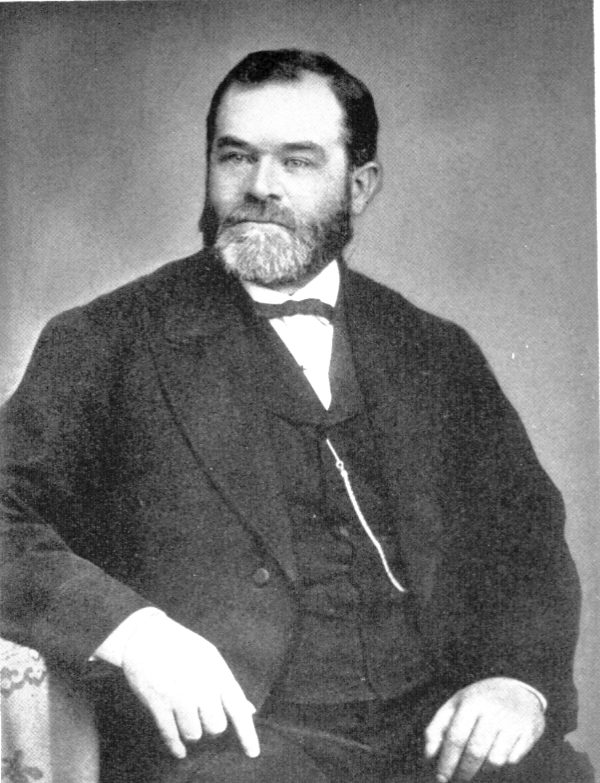
Nominee	Alonzo B. Cornell	Lucius Robinson	John Kelly
Party	Republican	Democratic	Independent Democrat
Popular vote	418,567	375,790	77,566
Percentage	46.68%	41.91%	8.65%
- County results Cornell: 40–50% 50–60% 60–70% Robinson: 30–40% 40–50% 50–60% 60–70% No Data
Governor before election
Lucius Robinson
Democratic
Elected Governor
Alonzo B. Cornell
Republican

The 1879 New York state election was held on November 4, 1879, to elect the governor, the lieutenant governor, the secretary state, the state comptroller, the attorney general, the state treasurer and the state engineer, as well as all members of the New York State Assembly and the New York State Senate.

== History ==
Due to the increase of the governor's term to three years by an amendment in 1874, this was the first time the governor and the state cabinet officers were elected at the same time.

The Greenback-Labor state convention met on August 28 and 29 at Utica, New York. William Voorhis was president.

The Republican state convention met on September 3. James W. Wadsworth was nominated for comptroller on the first ballot (vote: Wadsworth 273, John C. Churchill 152). Joseph B. Carr was nominated for secretary of state during the first ballot. Nathan D. Wendell was nominated for treasurer on the first ballot (vote: Wendell 279, Richard A. Elmer 83, Francis B. Brower 54, Francis C. Marvin 19). Hamilton Ward was nominated for attorney general during the first ballot. Howard Soule was nominated for state engineer by acclamation.

The Prohibition state convention met on September 3 at Syracuse, New York. James H. Bronson, of Amsterdam, was chairman. They nominated John W. Mears, of Oneida County, for governor; James H. Bronson for lieutenant governor; Alphonso A. Hopkins for secretary of state; Caleb W. Allis, of Onondaga County, for comptroller; Stephen Merritt for treasurer; Walter Farrington for attorney general; and John J. Hooker for state engineer.

The Democratic state convention met on September 11 at Wieting Hall in Syracuse, New York. Before the first ballot for governor was taken, the Tammany delegates left the convention. Then the incumbent Governor Lucius Robinson was re-nominated on the first ballot (vote: Robinson 243, Henry W. Slocum 56, Clarkson N. Potter 1, Horatio Seymour 1). Clarkson N. Potter was nominated for lieutenant governor by acclamation. Then the incumbents Beach, Olcott, Mackin, Seymour and Schoonmaker were re-nominated by acclamation.

The seceding Tammany delegates re-assembled at Shakespeare Hall. David Dudley Field was president. John Kelly was nominated for governor by acclamation. A Committee of Fifteen was appointed to ponder the question how to proceed and if a whole state ticket should be nominated.

== Results ==
Due to the split of the Democratic vote, Cornell had an easy victory over Robinson. Almost all the other offices were won by the Republicans in a very tight race, only State Engineer Seymour managed to be re-elected on the Democratic ticket. At the time, political commentators voiced their surprise about the strange inconsistency of, on the one side, the total number of votes for Governor compared to the vote for the other state offices on the Republican ticket, and, on the other side, the combined vote of Robinson and Kelly compared to the vote for the other state offices on the joint Democratic/Tammany ticket.

The incumbents Robinson, Beach, Olcott, Schoonmaker and Mackin were defeated. The incumbent Seymour was re-elected.

1879 state election results
Office	Republican ticket		Democratic ticket		Tammany ticket		Greenback-Labor ticket		Prohibition ticket		Socialist Labor ticket	Working Men ticket	Jeffersonian Democratic ticket
Governor	Alonzo B. Cornell	418,567	Lucius Robinson	375,790	John Kelly	77,566	Harris Lewis	20,286	John W. Mears	4,437	Caleb Pink	John Kelly	John Kelly
Lt. Gov.	George G. Hoskins	435,304	Clarkson N. Potter	435,014	Clarkson N. Potter		John M. Wieting	23,067	James H. Bronson	3,902	Osborne Ward	John M. Wieting	Robert W. Hume
Secretary of State	Joseph B. Carr	436,013	Allen C. Beach	434,138	Allen C. Beach		P. K. McCann	22,558	Alphonso A. Hopkins	4,226			
Comptroller	James W. Wadsworth	438,253	Frederic P. Olcott	432,325	Frederic P. Olcott		John A. Shannon	22,572	Caleb W. Allis	4,192			
Attorney General	Hamilton Ward, Sr.	437,382	Augustus Schoonmaker, Jr.	433,238	Augustus Schoonmaker, Jr.		James Wright	21,961	Walter Farrington	4,073			
Treasurer	Nathan D. Wendell	436,300	James Mackin	433,485	James Mackin		Jurian Winne	21,646	Stephen Merritt	4,149			
State Engineer	Howard Soule	427,240	Horatio Seymour, Jr.	439,681	Horatio Seymour, Jr.		Garret Nagle	22,779	John J. Hooker	4,043			

Obs.:For candidates nominated on more than one ticket, the numbers are the total votes on all tickets. "Scattering votes" (includes votes given for Socialist Labor, Working Men, Jeffersonian Democratic, non-running and non-existing candidates) ranging between 3,900 and 5,312 for the various offices.

== See also ==
- New York gubernatorial elections

== Sources ==
- The tickets: in NYT on November 3, 1879
- Result: GENERAL POLITICAL NEWS.; THE STATE VOTE DECLARED in NYT on December 13, 1879
- Result: The Tribune Almanac 1880
