= Howell Van Gerbig =

American athlete (1902–1965)

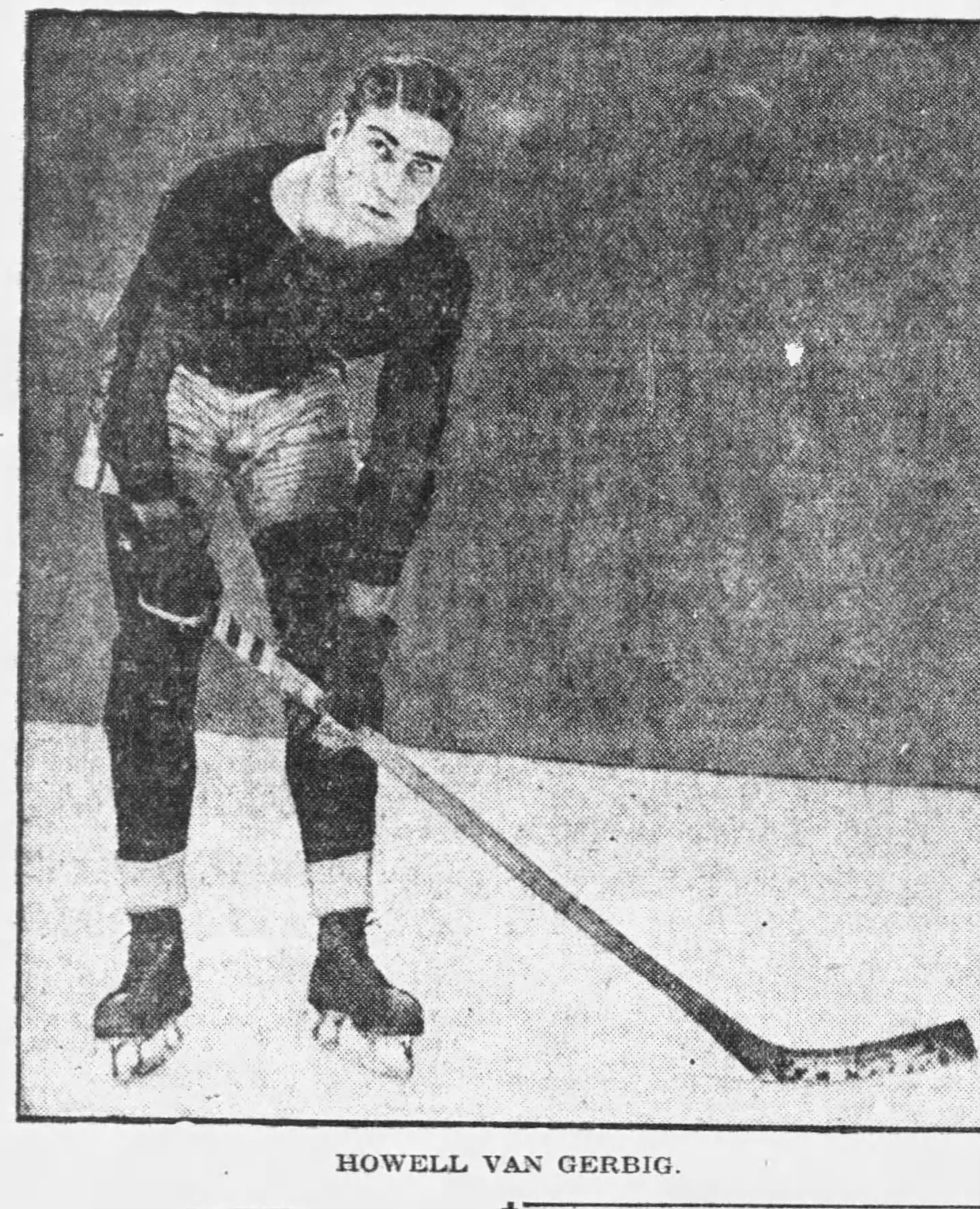

Personal information
- Born: June 19, 1902
- Died: May 15, 1965 (aged 62) Palm Beach, Florida, U.S.
- Education: Princeton University
- Spouses: Geraldine Livingston Thompson (m. 1926; div. 1937); Dorothy Randolph Fell (m. 1937; death 1945); Mary McFadden (m. 1950; div. 1952); Ann Trainer Barry (m. 1964)
- Children: 3, including Barry
- Relative: Frederic P. Olcott (grandfather)

Sport
- Sport: American football Ice hockey Squash; Golf

Achievements and titles
- National finals: 1922 College football champion 1930 U.S. Class B squash champion

Howell Van Gerbig (June 19, 1902 – May 13, 1965) was an American athlete who played for the Princeton Tigers men's ice hockey and football teams and was a national squash champion.

== Early life ==
Van Gerbig was born on June 19, 1902. He was the son of Barend and Edith (Olcott) Van Gerbig and grandson of Frederic P. Olcott. He graduated from the St. Paul's School.

== Princeton ==
=== Football ===
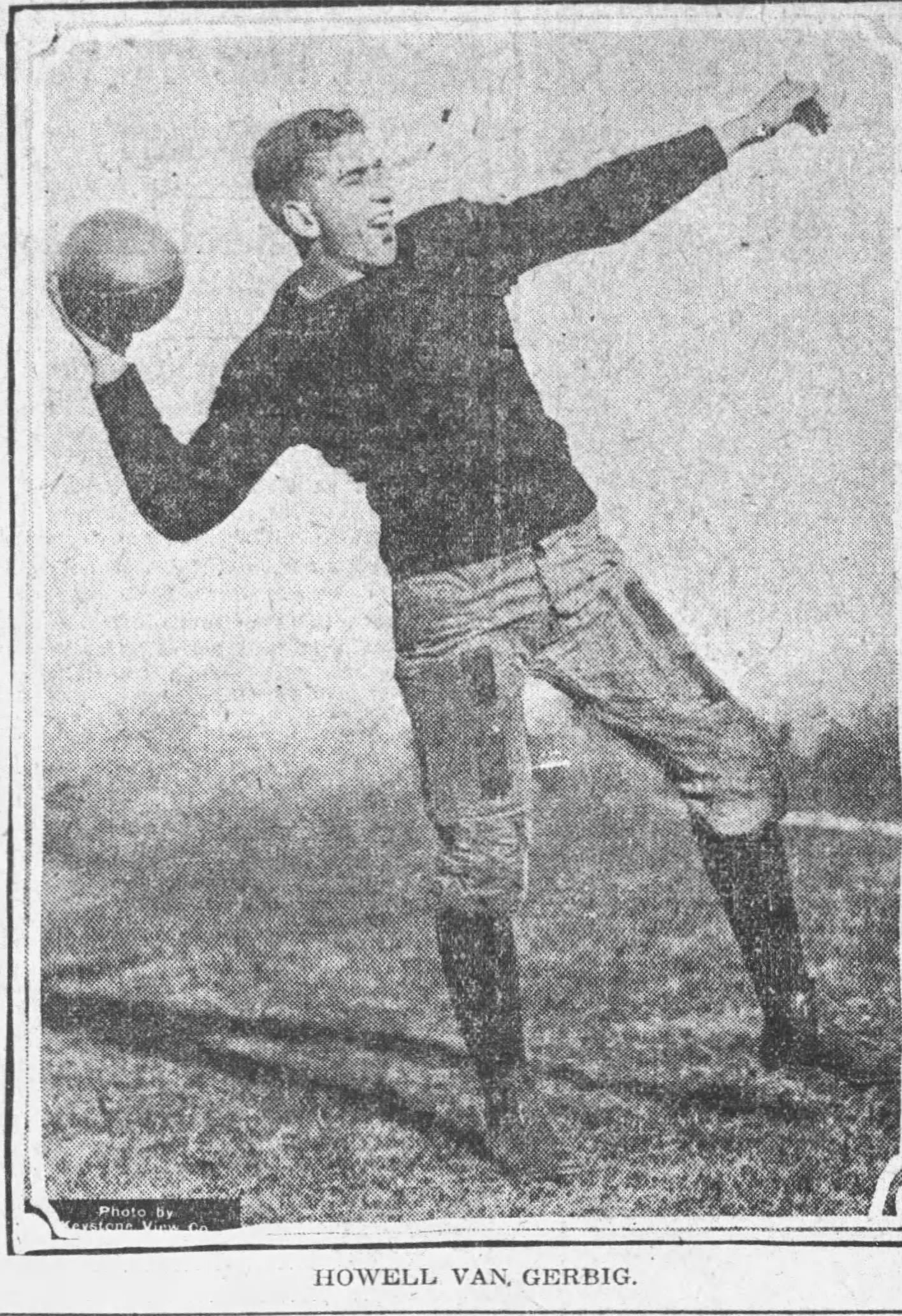

Van Gerbig played halfback for the Princeton freshman team in 1920. He made the varsity team the following season and was the backup fullback behind Hank Garrity. He started against Navy and Chicago while Garrity hurt. Due to an injury to Donold Lourie, Garrity was moved to quarterback and Van Gerbig started at halfback. Van Gerbig scored a receiving touchdown in Princeton's 34 to 0 win over Virginia. Van Gerbig was the backup halfback behind Harry W. Crum on Princeton's 1922 national championship team. He was a starting back for the 1923 Princeton Tigers football team. He was the team's best punter and scored two touchdowns against Swarthmore College. Van Gerbig muffed a punt in the third quarter against Harvard, which led to Crimson scoring the go-ahead field goal in their 5–0 victory.

=== Hockey ===
Van Gerbig debuted for the Princeton Tigers men's ice hockey team in 1921. On January 6, 1922, he scored all four goals in Princeton's 4–0 victory over Penn.

On March 20, 1922, Van Gerbig was elected captain of the 1922–23 Princeton Tigers men's ice hockey team. He started the season as a defenseman, but was moved to right wing during the January 5, 1923 game against the St. Nicholas Hockey Club, which was the first game ever played at the Hobey Baker Memorial Rink. He scored the game-tying and game-winning goals in the Tigers' 3–2 victory over St. Nicks. Later that year, Van Gerbig had a five-goal game against MIT and a six-goal game against Penn. On January 13, he scored two goals in Princeton's 3 to 1 victory over the George Owen-led Harvard Crimson. Four days later, he recorded a hat-trick in a 14–0 victory over Columbia. Princeton finished the season with a 13–5–1 record.

Going into his senior season, Van Gerbig was described by Boston Globe hockey writer John J. Hallahan as "one of the greatest in the college ranks" and "the nearest approach Princeton has ever had to the great Hobey Baker". On January 4, 1924, Van Gerbig scored a goal in a 2–1 victory over Dartmouth, which was captained by another leading college player, Bob Hall, at the Boston Arena. On January 12, he scored all three of Princeton's goals in the Tigers 4–3 double-overtime loss to Yale. On January 24, Van Gerbig scored the game-tying goal in a 4–1 overtime victory against the St. Nicholas Hockey Club. On February 22, he scored the game-winning goal in Princeton's 1–0 double-overtime upset of the Yale Bulldogs.

== Boston Athletic Association ==
On November 11, 1924, Van Gerbig joined the Boston Athletic Association ice hockey team. He played his first game for the B.A.A. on December 6, 1924, and scored a goal in the Unicorn's 5–3 loss to the Maple A. A. On January 17, 1925, his cheek was injured in a game against the Fort Pitt Hornets where teammate Leo Hughes lost an eye. Doctors recommended Van Gerbig sit out the team's next game against Fort Pitt, which he refused to do. He was eventually convinced by his mother to sit out the remainder of the regular season, however he returned for the Eastern championship series against the Hornets. The B.A.A disbanded its team after the season due to rumors that their players had violated their amateur status by receiving money from Boston Arena management.

== Squash ==
Van Gerbig competed in the 1929 United States Class C squash tennis championship tournament. He made it to the semifinals, where he lost to Harold Ablowich. On February 27, 1930, Van Gerbig defeated Adrian S. Kuhn in three sets to capture the national Class B championship. He had little playing experience prior to the tournament, but was a protege of former world champion Walter Kinsella. Van Gerbig was a hard-hitter and shattered three racquets during the final.

== Golf ==
Van Gerbig played golf for many years, but began taking the sport seriously in 1940. He won invitational golf tournaments at the Rumson County Club, Sands Point Golf Club, Meadow Brook Golf Club, and Piping Rock Club.

== Business career ==
A licensed pilot, Van Gerbig was a director of the Transcontinental & Western Air and general manager of the Ranger Engines Division of Fairchild Aircraft.

== Personal life ==
In 1926, Van Gerbig married Geraldine Livingston Thompson, daughter of Geraldine Morgan Thompson and niece of Ruth Morgan. They had one son, Peter Van Gerbig. They divorced in 1937 and Van Gerbig married Dorothy Randolph Fell, stepdaughter of former United States Secretary of the Treasury Ogden L. Mills and granddaughter of Alexander Van Rensselaer, later that year. They had two sons, Barend "Barry" Van Gerbig and Howell "Mickey" Van Gerbig Jr. Dorothy Van Gerbig died on July 28, 1945, of "thrombosis of a brain artery". She was 32 years old. During the 1950s, Van Gerbig was married to the mother of fashion designer Mary McFadden. On December 15, 1964, Van Gerbig married fellow golf champion Ann Trainer Barry.

In 1929, Van Gerbig purchased Pine Needle Camp, a twenty-acre, eight-building property on Upper Saranac Lake, for his first wife, who was suffering from tuberculosis. Following their divorce, he sold it to John Langeloth Loeb Sr.

== Death ==
A heavy drinker for much of his adult life, Van Gerbig had abstained from alcohol for almost a year when on May 13, 1965, he shot himself. His wife and maid stated they saw no signs of despondency and Van Gerbig did not leave a suicide note. In 1970, his widow married Morton Downey.
