= Benjamin Knower =

Benjamin Knower (1775 Roxbury, now a borough of Boston, Massachusetts – August 23, 1839 Watervliet, Albany County, New York) was an American merchant, banker and politician.

== Early life ==
By 1800 he had removed to Dutchess County, New York. Before 1810, he settled in Albany, New York where he sold hats made by his brother Timothy in Guilderland, New York. Local lore had it that the hats were made waterproof by immersion in the Bozenkill, a stream behind a mansion in Knowersville, a village of Guilderland.

== Career ==
Knower was a presidential elector in 1820, voting for James Monroe and Daniel D. Tompkins.

He was New York State Treasurer from 1821 to 1824, and was one of the leading members of the Albany Regency. On April 28, 1824, his daughter Cornelia (ca. 1801–1889) married State Comptroller William L. Marcy.

Knower became rich as a financier of the Erie Canal and as a director of the Mechanics' and Farmers' Bank of Albany, and served as the bank's president from 1817 until 1834 when he was forced to resign because of "financial embarrassments."

== Personal life ==
On June 21, 1800, he married Sarah Van Kleek (1779–1833) at the Dutch Reformed Church in Poughkeepsie, New York. After the death of his first wife, on June 23, 1836, he married Sophia P. Castle (d. 1886) in New York City.

He was buried at the Albany Rural Cemetery in Menands, New York. His home at Guilderland, New York known as the Knower House was listed on the National Register of Historic Places in 1982.

== Sources ==
- Political Graveyard
- The New York Civil List compiled by Franklin Benjamin Hough (page 35; Weed, Parsons and Co., 1858) (Google Books)
- Knower genealogy, at rootsweb (giving wrong date of death)
- Obit in The Annals of Albany by Joel Munsell (1859), at rootsweb

Political offices
Preceded by Gerrit L. Dox	New York State Treasurer; 1821–1824	Succeeded by Abraham Keyser, Jr.
