= James Mackin =

American politician

James Mackin (December 25, 1822 in Newburgh, Orange County, New York – March 1887) was an American merchant, banker and politician.

== Life ==
He lived at Fishkill Landing where he was a merchant and real estate agent. He was appointed Postmaster of Fishkill during the presidency of Zachary Taylor and kept the post for about four years. In July 1858, he married Sarah E. Wiltse (d. 1862).

He had been a Whig, and joined the Republican Party upon its foundation in 1855. He was a supervisor of the Town of Fishkill in 1858 and 1859 and was Chairman of the Board of Supervisors in 1859. He was a Republican member of the New York State Assembly (Dutchess Co., 1st D.) in 1859.

In 1872, he was President of the Village of Fishkill Landing. He was again a member of the State Assembly in 1873, 1874 and 1875. He was a delegate to the 1876 Democratic National Convention at St. Louis, Missouri. He was New York State Treasurer from 1878 to 1879, elected at the New York state election, 1877, but defeated for re-election at the New York state election, 1879. On October 10, 1878, bank-robbers attempted to rob the First National Bank of Fishkill Landing of which Mackin was President. On November 13, 1878, at St. Louis, he married Sallie Britton, the daughter of James H. Britton, Mayor of St. Louis 1875-1876.

He was a member of the New York State Senate (13th D.) in 1882 and 1883.

He was buried in the churchyard of the Reformed Dutch Church at Fishkill Landing (now Beacon, New York) in the same vault with his first wife.

In 1895, his widow published her memoirs, International Reminiscences.

== Sources ==
- Political Graveyard
- Biographical Sketches of the State Officers and Members of the Legislature in the State of New York in 1859 by Wm. D. Murphy (pages 189f; C. Van Benthuysen, Albany NY, 1859)
- Old gravestones at the Dutch Reformed Churchyard, at rootsweb
- History of Fishkill
- His first marriage, in NYT on July 10, 1858
- The bank robbery, in NYT on October 11, 1878
- His wedding, in NYT on November 17, 1878
- Prognosis on his chances of being elected State Senator, in NYT on November 7, 1881
- Election results, in NYT on November 9, 1881
- His funeral, in NYT on March 10, 1887
- His widow's book, in NYT on November 17, 1895

New York State Assembly
Preceded by Albert Emans	New York State Assembly; Dutchess County, 1st District; 1859	Succeeded by Abiah W. Palmer
Political offices
Preceded by Charles N. Ross	New York State Treasurer; 1878–1879	Succeeded by Nathan D. Wendell
New York State Senate
Preceded by Edward M. Madden	New York State Senate; 13th District; 1882–1883	Succeeded by Henry R. Low
