= Ezra Ames =

American painter (1768–1836)

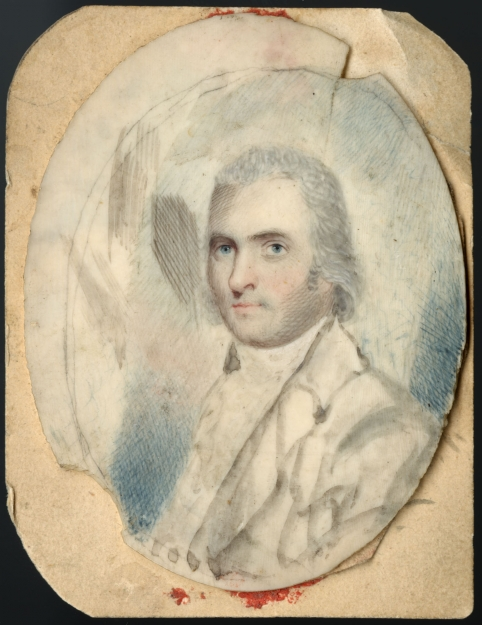
- Born: May 5, 1768; Framingham
- Died: February 23, 1836; Albany
- Occupations: Painter, engraver, gilder

Ezra Ames (May 5, 1768 – February 23, 1836) was a popular portrait painter in Albany, New York, during the late 18th and early 19th centuries. More than 700 portraits have been attributed to him.

== Life and career ==
He was born in Framingham, Massachusetts, in 1768. He moved to Worcester, Massachusetts, in 1790, and married Zipporah Wood in 1794. Some time later he moved to Albany, New York, where he painted a number of prominent people, including early portraits of Governor George Clinton and Alexander Hamilton.

It is not known whether Ames was formally trained or not, but his work had a popular appeal. In addition to portraits and landscapes, Ames' surviving accounts books indicated he painted miniatures, carriages, fire buckets, fences, mirror frames, and furniture.

Ames painted a number of still lifes, landscapes, and history paintings, and was skilled at engraving. The Chautauqan Magazine describes his importance in this way:

(he) was the most noted portraitist in the state, outside New York city. The sure and fluent ease of his brush, his keen characterization, his pure, fresh coloring, are all remarkable for this early period. His portrait of Governor George Clinton, exhibited at the Pennsylvania Academy in 1812, won him wide notice; but he did delightful work some years earlier, and many even finer canvases are scattered through the middle states, in private hands.

During his career Ames painted many members of the New York State legislature and retired comfortably on his savings built up during his prolific career, primarily between 1800 and 1820. In fact he became known unofficially as the (official) New York State portrait painter. Ames was an active freemason, which brought him a number of commissions from his fellows.

Ames served as chairman of the Fine Arts Committee of the Society for the Promotion of Useful Arts in 1805, and was also President of the Mechanics' and Farmers' Bank of Albany.

He died in 1836 and is buried at the Albany Rural Cemetery (Lot 1 Section 59). Ames was posthumously elected an honorary member of the American Academy of Fine Arts in New York City.

Ames had three children, two of whom followed him into the business: Angelo Ames and Julius Rubens Ames (1801–1850).

== Paintings by Ezra Ames ==
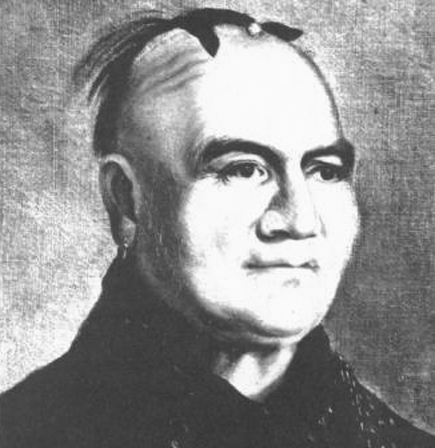
Portrait of Joseph Brant

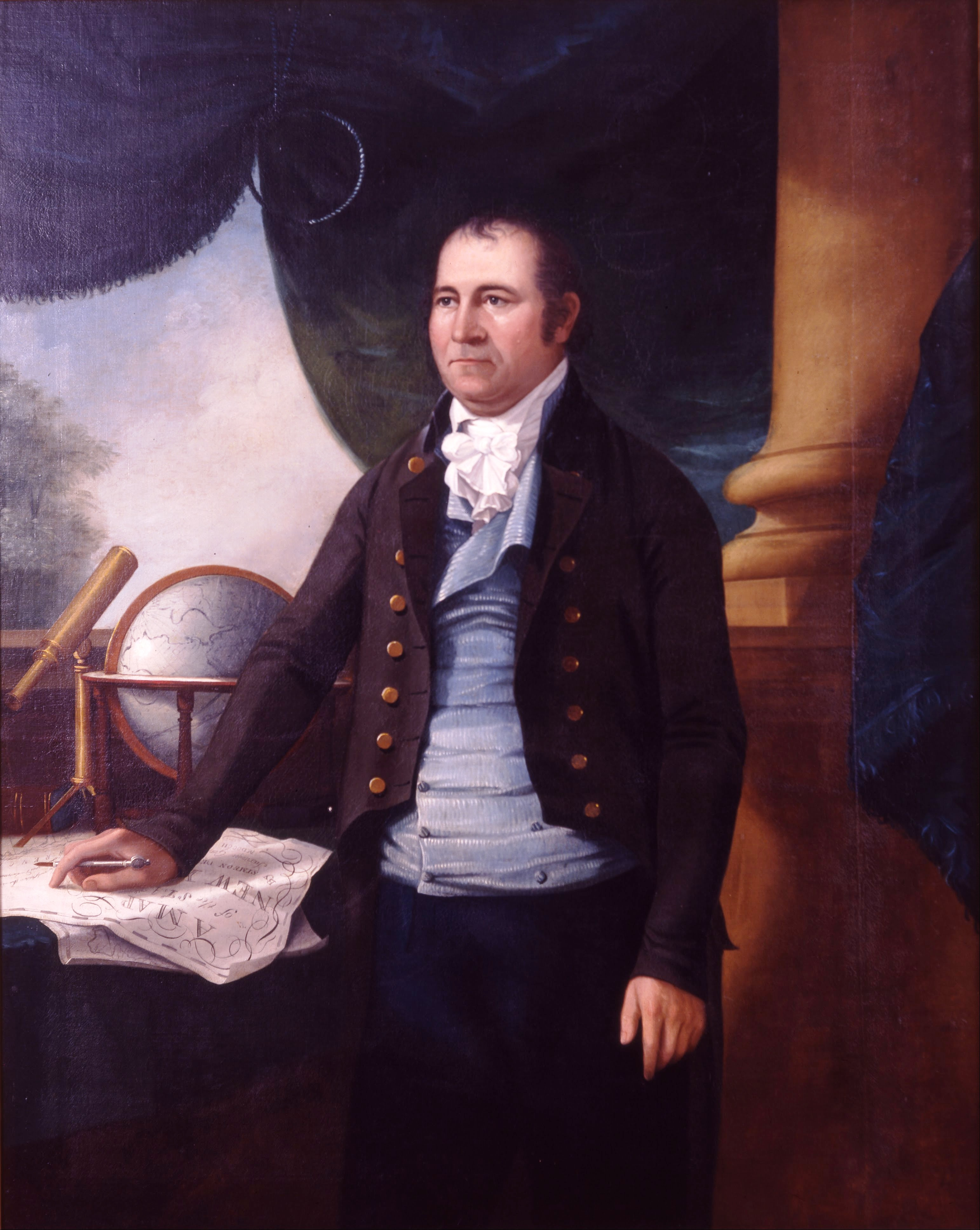
Portrait of Simeon De Witt

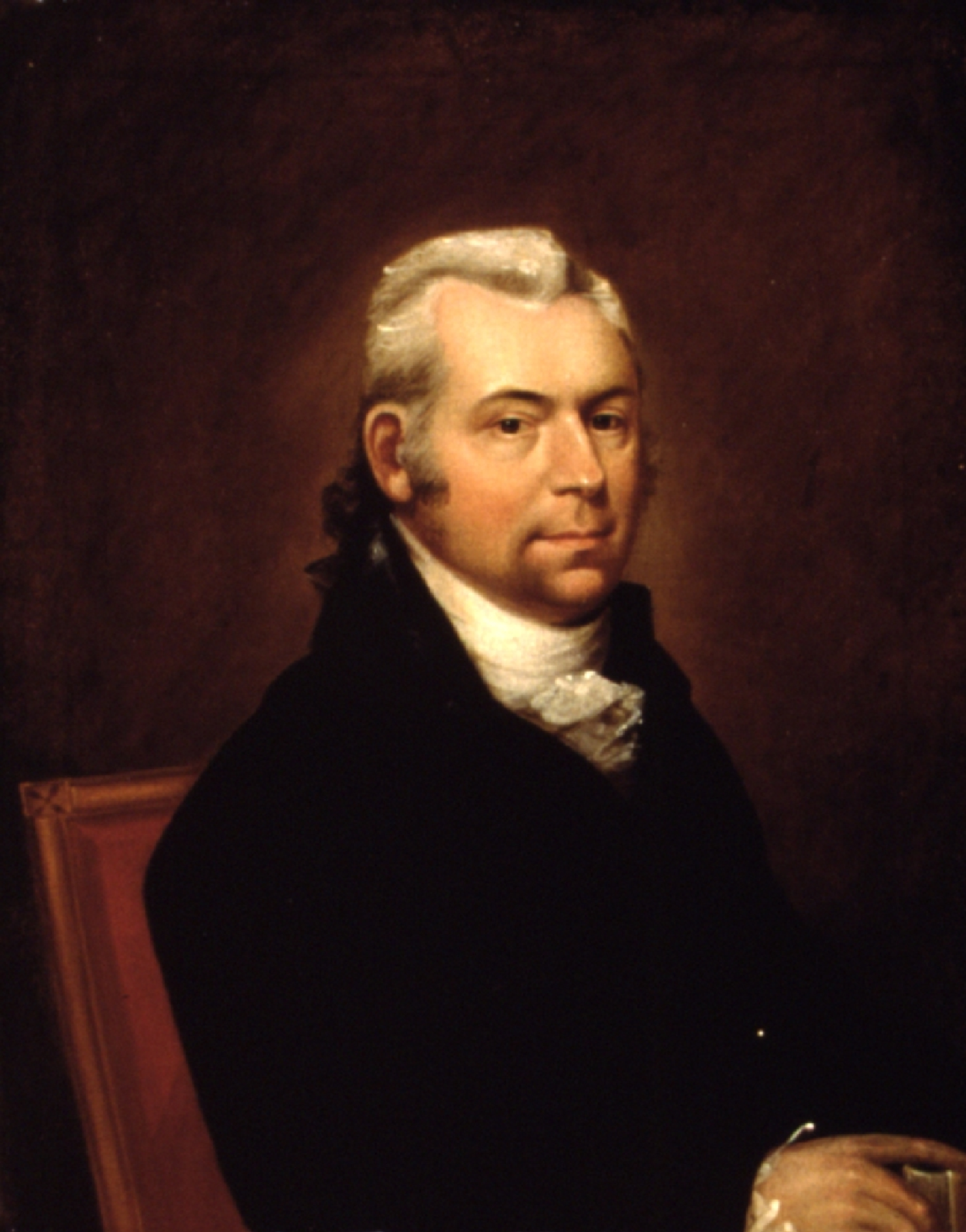
Portrait of Gideon Granger

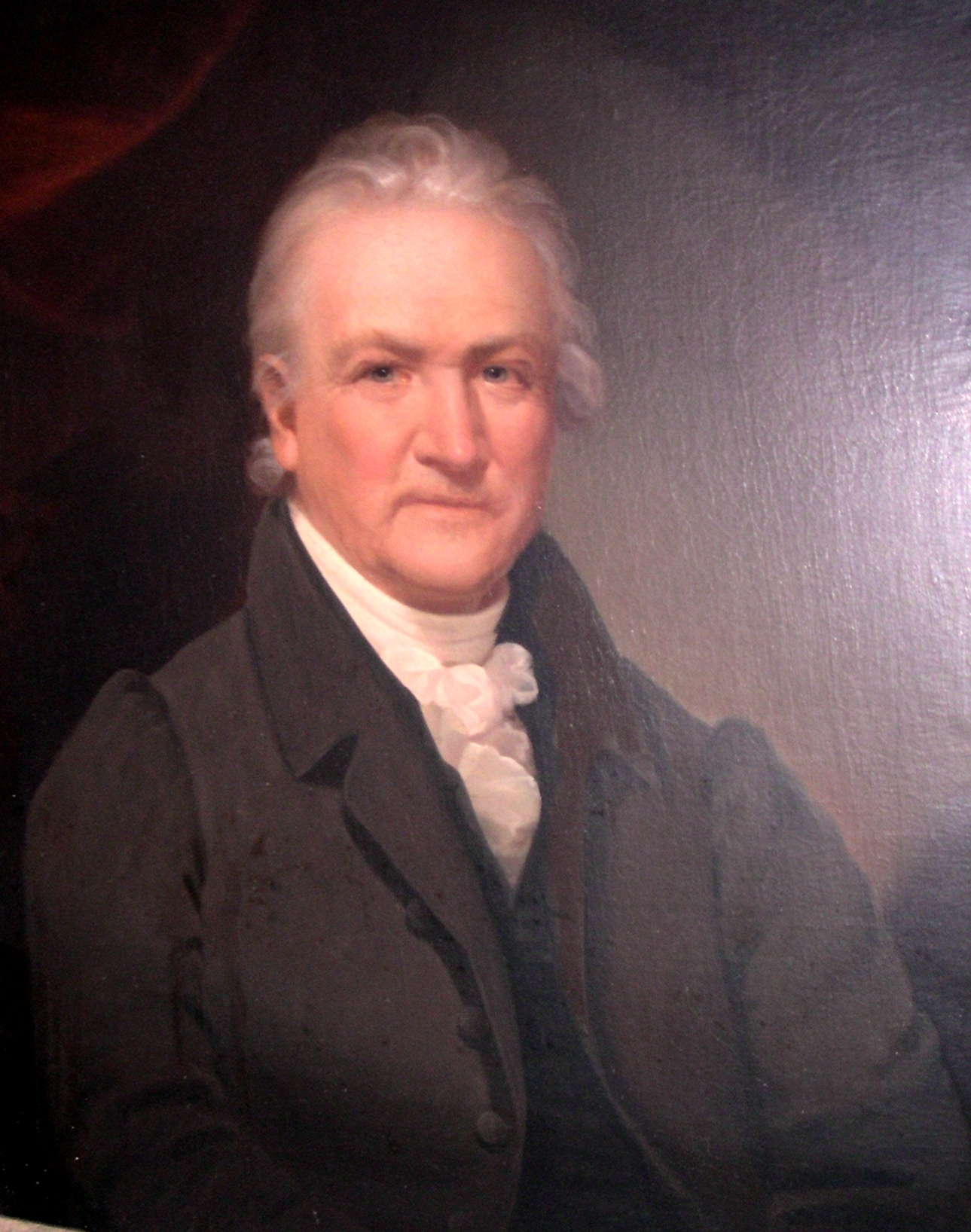
Portrait of Solomon Townsend

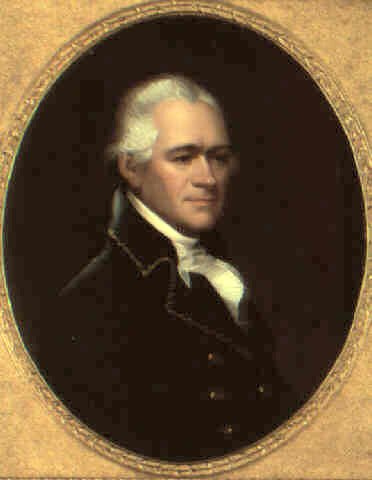
Portrait of Alexander Hamilton

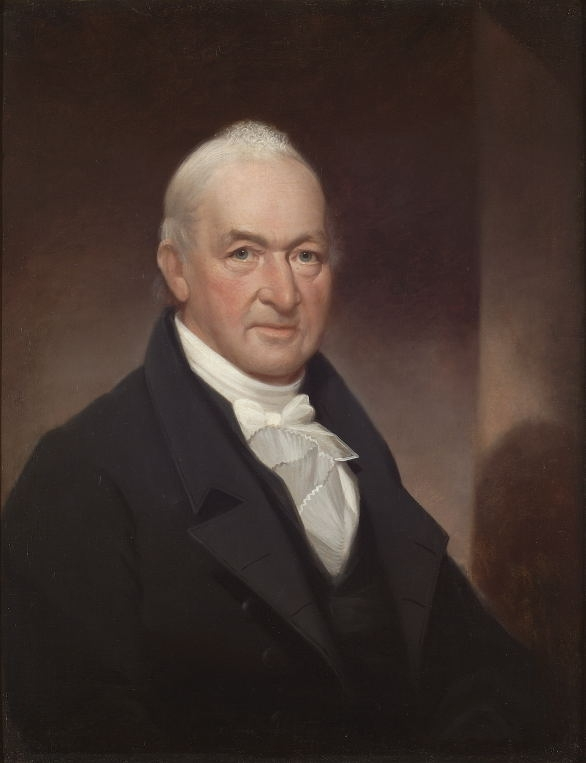
Benjamin Tallmadge

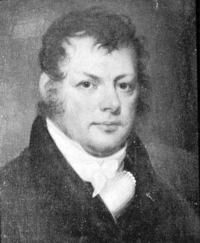
Francis Bloodgood 1768-1840

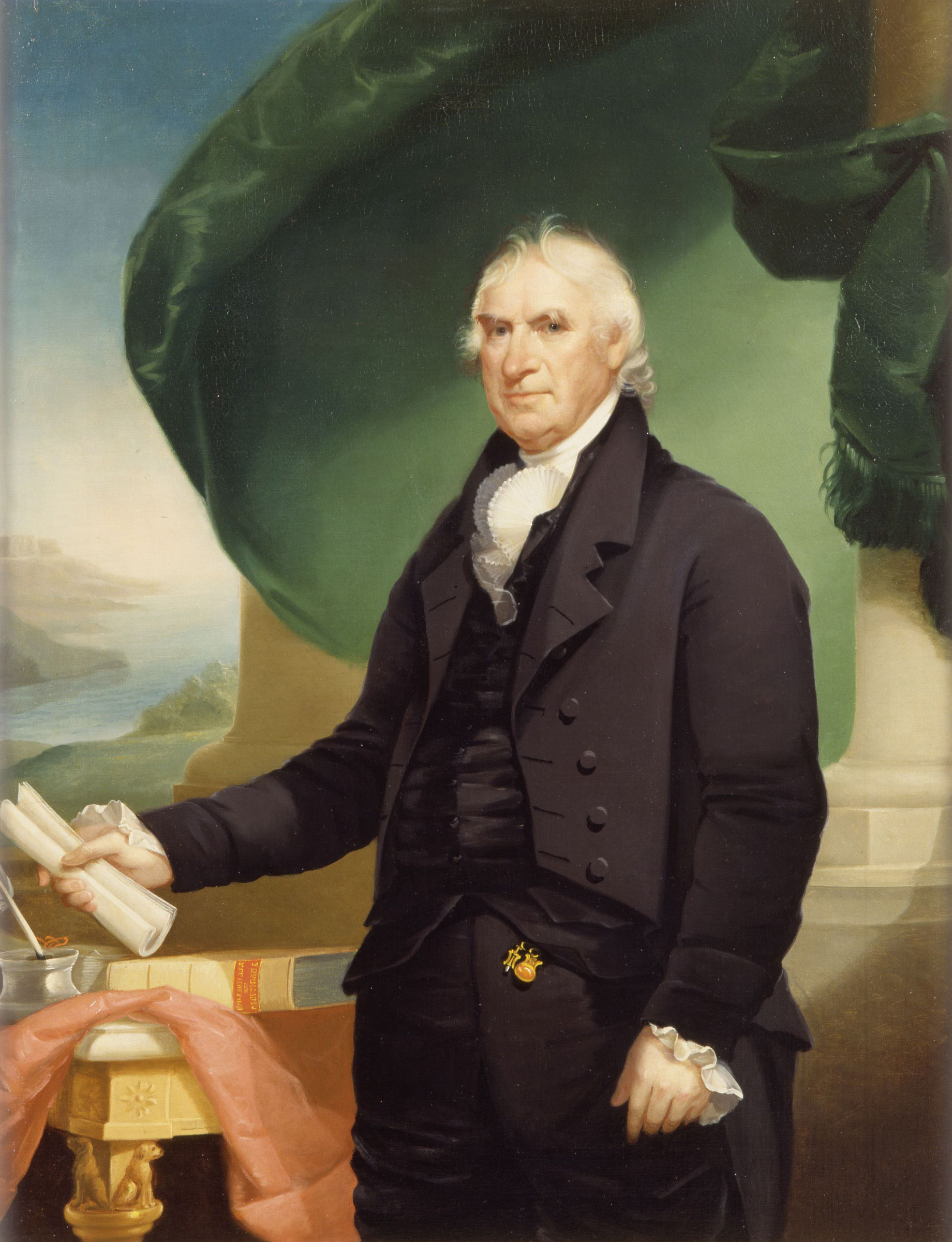
George Clinton

== Sources ==
- Albany Institute of History and Art article
- New York State Museum article
