= John D. Van Buren Jr. =

American lawyer

New York State Engineer and Surveyor
- In office 1876–1877
- Governor: Samuel J. Tilden; Lucius Robinson
- Preceded by: Sylvanus H. Sweet
- Succeeded by: Horatio Seymour Jr.

Personal details
- Born: August 8, 1838; New York City, New York, U.S.
- Died: March 11, 1918 (aged 79); New Brighton, Staten Island, U.S.
- Spouse: Elizabeth Ludlow Jones (m. 1876)
- Parent(s): John D. Van Buren; Elvira Lynch Aymar Van Buren
- Education: Harvard University; Rensselaer Polytechnic Institute

John Dash Van Buren Jr. (August 8, 1838 – March 11, 1918) was an American civil engineer, naval engineer, lawyer and politician from New York. He was New York State Engineer and Surveyor from 1876 to 1877.

== Early life ==
Van Buren was born on August 8, 1838, in New York City. He was the son of Assemblyman John D. Van Buren (1811–1885) and Elvira Lynch (née Aymar) Van Buren (1817–1898).

He studied at Lawrence Scientific School of Harvard University, and graduated C.E. from Rensselaer Polytechnic Institute in 1860.

== Career ==
From 1860 to 1861, he was Assistant Engineer of the Croton Aqueduct Department of New York City. At the outbreak of the American Civil War, he joined the Engineering Corps of the U.S. Navy and was on duty in the Gulf of Mexico, the Bureau of Steam Engineering and the Peninsula Campaign. Afterwards, he was for four years an Assistant Professor of Natural Philosophy and Engineering at the United States Naval Academy.

In 1868, he resigned his commission of First Assistant Engineer, with the rank of lieutenant, studied law, was admitted to the bar in 1869, and practiced for a short time in New York City. Then he returned to engineering, and entered the service of the City of New York as Assistant Engineer in the Bureau of Sewers, and later as Assistant Engineer in the Department of Docks under General George B. McClellan, his commanding officer of the Peninsula Campaign who had been appointed Chief Engineer of the Department of Docks in 1870.

In 1875, Van Buren was a member of the Tilden Commission to investigate the State canals. He was State Engineer and Surveyor from 1876 to 1877, elected in November 1875 on the Democratic ticket. Afterwards he resumed his private practice.

== Personal life ==
In 1875, he married Elizabeth Ludlow Jones (sister of banker Shipley Jones), and their son was Maurice Pelham Van Buren (1894–1979).

He died on March 11, 1918, in New Brighton, Staten Island.

=== Legacy ===
He was a member of the American Society of Civil Engineers, and of the American Society of Naval Engineers. Besides papers in theJournal of the Franklin Institute and the Transactions of the American Society of Civil Engineers, he has published Investigation of Formulas for Iron Parts of Steam Machinery (New York, 1869).

Political offices
Preceded by Sylvanus H. Sweet	New York State Engineer and Surveyor; 1876 - 1877	Succeeded by Horatio Seymour Jr.
