= John D. Van Buren =

American politician

John Dash Van Buren (March 18, 1811 in New York City – December 1, 1885 in Newburgh, Orange County, New York) was an American merchant and politician from New York.

He was the son of Michael Van Beuren (1786–1854) and Anne (Dash) Van Beuren. He graduated from Columbia College in 1829. Then he studied law in the office of Hugh Maxwell, but soon abandoned this and became a merchant instead. On March 30, 1836, he married Elvira Lynch Aymar (1817–1898), and they had four children, among them State Engineer John D. Van Buren Jr. (1838–1918) and Brooklyn Chief Engineer Robert Van Buren (1843–1919), who helped to design the Carroll Street Bridge.

Van Buren was a member of the New York State Assembly (Orange Co., 1st D.) in 1863. On May 26, 1863, he was appointed by Gov. Horatio Seymour as Paymaster-General of the State Militia, with the rank of colonel, and remained in office until the end of 1864.

He was Gov. John T. Hoffman's private secretary from 1869 to 1872.

Van Buren died "suddenly of apoplexy," and was buried at the Woodlawn Cemetery in New Windsor, New York.

== Sources ==
- The New York Civil List compiled by Franklin Benjamin Hough, Stephen C. Hutchins and Edgar Albert Werner (1870; pg. 399, 401 and 498)
- Biographical Sketches of the State Officers and the Members of the Legislature of the State of New York in 1862 and '63 by William D. Murphy (1863; pg. 417f)
- OBITUARY; JOHN D. VAN BUREN in NYT on December 2, 1885

New York State Assembly
Preceded by Daniel R. Hudson	New York State Assembly; Orange County, 1st District; 1863	Succeeded by Nathaniel W. Howell
