= Barry Van Gerbig =

American socialite and businessman

Barend "Barry" van Gerbig (born 1939) is a US millionaire socialite best known as the owner of the National Hockey League's California Seals.

== Early life ==
Van Gerbig was born in New York City as the son of attorney Howell Van Gerbig and his wife Dorothy Fell Van Gerbig. He attended Princeton University, graduating in 1961. At Princeton, he played for the school's ice hockey squad as a goaltender. After graduation, he briefly played minor league hockey for the Charlotte Checkers and Des Moines Oak Leafs. Afterward, he worked on Wall Street, owning stock in Union Carbide and Standard Oil of New Jersey.

== Involvement in the NHL ==
Van Gerbig was a friend of a number of NHL owners, including Bruce Norris of the Detroit Red Wings, Weston Adams of the Boston Bruins (and his attorney, Charles Mulcahy), and William Jennings of the New York Rangers. Mulcahy had suggested van Gerbig buy into the Bruins' Western Hockey League affiliate, the San Francisco Seals as a way of getting in on a planned expansion of the NHL in 1967.

Van Gerbig assembled a group of what would eventually be 52 investors, including singer Bing Crosby (his godfather), San Francisco 49ers quarterback John Brodie, Ice Follies owner Virgil Sherrill and Nelson Doubleday, Jr. After owning the WHL Seals (relocated to Oakland due to arena issues) in 1966–67, the Seals entered the NHL. Due to poor attendance van Gerbig attempted to sell the team three times, including to Labatt Brewing Company, who intended to relocate the team to Vancouver, but that and a subsequent deal with Woolworth's heirs Northrup and Seymour Knox were rejected by the NHL. A third sale to Trans National Communications did go through in 1969, but when they missed a payment to van Gerbig, fell into default, with the Seals reverting to van Gerbig. In the end, van Gerbig sold the team to Charlie O. Finley in 1970.

== Personal life ==
In 1961, Van Gerbig married Lois Hochschwender. The marriage ended in divorce. Van Gerbig married Victoria Susan Fairbanks, daughter of Douglas Fairbanks, Jr in 1965. They had two children, Barry and Elizabeth (born 1966 and 1968, respectively). He and Victoria divorced in 1977. He has residences on Long Island and West Palm Beach. In 2008, he married Virginia Eriksson, and became step father to 3 children, Amber, Kirsten, and Christian Eriksson.
