= San Francisco Seals (ice hockey) =

- City: San Francisco, California, Oakland, California
- League: Western Hockey League
- Founded: 1961
- Operated: 1961–1967
- Home arena: Cow Palace (1961–1966), Oakland Arena (1966–1967)
- Colors: Black, yellow and white

Franchise history
- 1961–1966: San Francisco Seals
- 1966–1967: California Seals

Championships
- Playoff championships: 2 (1963, 1964)

The San Francisco Seals were a minor league hockey team which played in the Western Hockey League from 1961 to 1967.

== Pro hockey returns to California ==
After his Spokane Comets were eliminated from the 1960–61 WHL playoffs, owner Mel Smith announced that he was considering moving the Comets to either San Francisco or Los Angeles. Los Angeles Sports Arena general manager Bill Nicholas had already told the National Hockey League that he would affiliate with the WHL if he were not awarded an NHL expansion franchise by the summer of 1961. As a result, WHL president Al Leader visited both the Cow Palace in Daly City and the Sports Arena to evaluate their availability for WHL play.

On April 23, 1961, the WHL granted an expansion franchise for San Francisco to former Vancouver Canucks owner Coleman (Coley) Hall, on the condition that an ice surface be installed in the Cow Palace. At the same time, the WHL approved the relocation of the Victoria Cougars to Los Angeles, where they were renamed the Los Angeles Blades. The San Francisco franchise, named the "Seals" in honor of the city's former minor league baseball team, and Blades were California's first pro hockey teams since the San Francisco Shamrocks and Los Angeles Monarchs left the Pacific Coast Hockey League, as the WHL was then known, in 1950.

Under coach Max McNab, the Seals debuted on Oct. 13, 1961 with an 8–3 road loss to the Seattle Totems at Civic Arena. Their first home game at the Cow Palace took place a month later, with the Seals losing 5–3 to the Edmonton Flyers on Nov. 17. The Seals finished 29–39–2 in their first season and were eliminated by Spokane two games to none in their first-round playoff series.

== Championship years (1962–63 and 1963–64) ==
Following McNab's departure to take over the Vancouver Canucks, the Seals lured coach and general manager Norman "Bud" Poile south from the defending champion Flyers. Poile had won three championships in eight seasons at Edmonton; with the Seals, he would add two more.

Poile's teams generally led the league in penalty minutes, and his 1962–63 Seals fit the mold. Led by hard-nosed players such as Orland Kurtenbach, Larry McNabb, Nick Mickoski and Charlie Burns, the Seals developed a fierce rivalry with the Portland Buckaroos, perennial WHL front-runners. For the next two seasons, Portland-San Francisco games had the atmosphere of a heavyweight title fight, and games between the two routinely attracted crowds of 8,000 or more. The Blades were another rival; Cow Palace crowds loved to hate defenseman "Big Burly Bill Burega."

After finishing 44–25–1 in the 1962–63 regular season, the Seals eliminated Los Angeles in three games in the first round of the playoffs, then outlasted the Buckaroos in seven rugged semifinal contests, taking the seventh and final game 3–1 at Portland.

In the 1963 Lester Patrick Cup finals, the Seals faced the Totems, with all seven games played at the Cow Palace due to scheduling conflicts in Seattle. Trailing 3 games to 1, the Seals came back to win the last three games – the last two in overtime – and captured San Francisco's first pro hockey championship. Kurtenbach scored the Cup-winning goal 4 minutes into overtime of the Seals' 4–3 Game 7 victory.

Even though the WHL contracted in 1963–64 – Edmonton and Calgary both requested a leave of absence following the playoffs – the Seals finished a distant fourth during the regular season behind the Denver Invaders, who had relocated from Spokane. But superb play from forward Al Nicholson and goalie Bob Perreault helped the Seals win the final three games of their first-round playoff series against Portland. The Seals would go on to become the first team to win back-to-back Patrick Cup titles, defeating the Blades in six games in the only all-California final. Around this time Hall sold the team to a 25-man group led by Mel Swig.

== Move to Oakland and transition to the NHL ==
In 1965, while the Seals were en route to missing the playoffs for the only time in their existence, the NHL announced that it planned to expand through the creation of a second six-team division – a move prompted by the desire for a new U.S. television contract, as well as rumors that the WHL and American Hockey League were considering merging to form a rival major league. The WHL and AHL played an interlocking schedule in 1965–66, but by then the NHL had made up its mind.

In February 1966, the NHL selected San Francisco–Oakland as one of the six expansion markets, along with Los Angeles, Pittsburgh, Philadelphia, Minneapolis–St. Paul and St. Louis. Rather than build a brand new expansion club, Barry Van Gerbig purchased the team from the Swig group, with intent of bringing the club into the NHL as the expansion team. In the process he became the Seals' prospective governor for the team's entry into the NHL. By then, Poile had turned over the coaching reins to player-coach Charlie Burns; the Seals reached the 1966 WHL playoffs and were one game away from their third finals appearance, but lost the last two games of their first-round playoff series against the eventual WHL champion Victoria Maple Leafs, which prevailed 4 games to 3.

Following the playoff defeat, van Gerbig began preparing the Seals for their move to the NHL. He relocated the club from the Cow Palace to the brand-new Oakland–Alameda County Coliseum across the bay in Oakland for what was their final WHL season in 1966–67, changing their name to the California Seals. Former Chicago Black Hawks coach Rudy Pilous took over as coach, alternating duties with Burns, as the Seals recorded only their second winning record (32–30–10). The Seals' six-year run in the WHL ended when they were eliminated in the first round of the playoffs by Seattle; California's final WHL game was a 4–1 loss to the Totems on April 15, 1967, at the Seattle Center Coliseum.

Tom Thurlby, one of the first five players signed by the Seals on September 7, 1961, was the only Seal to remain with the team for all six of its seasons in the WHL. He would also play 20 games for the NHL Seals in 1967–68.

When the club joined the NHL, Gerbig retained a portion of the club's WHL roster — Charlie Burns, George Swarbrick, Gerry Odrowski, Tom Thurlby and Ron Harris. The rest of the club was built through an expansion draft.

== After the WHL ==
As the organization left behind its WHL history and started anew as an NHL expansion franchise, the team retained the "California Seals" name in an effort to appeal to fans in both San Francisco and Oakland. However, after only a few months, the team had failed to attract many fans from San Francisco, and the name was changed to the Oakland Seals. When Oakland A's owner Charlie Finley bought the Seals in 1970, he renamed them the California Golden Seals; Finley would quickly lose patience with the struggling franchise and ended up selling the team back to the NHL.

The ongoing struggles of the Seals in the NHL had them the subject of relocation talks multiple times, with moves being considered to Vancouver for 1968 and Denver in 1975; both markets would end up getting separate NHL teams in the form of the Vancouver Canucks and Colorado Rockies. By 1976, minority owners George and Gordon Gund convinced principal owner Melvin Swig to relocate the franchise to Richfield, Ohio as the Cleveland Barons. In 1978, the Gund brothers, now sole owners, agreed to merge their organization with another flailing NHL club, the Minnesota North Stars, effectively cancelling the Seals/Barons' NHL franchise.

The NHL would return to the San Francisco Bay Area with the foundation of the San Jose Sharks, created when the Gund brothers sold their interest in the North Stars in 1990 to accept an expansion franchise for 1991. In 1993, the North Stars relocated to Texas to become the Dallas Stars. Neither NHL franchise recognizes the NHL records of the Seals/Barons franchise as their own, let alone the records of the predecessor WHL franchise.

== Season-by-season record ==
Note: GP = Games played, W = Wins, L = Losses, T = Ties, Pts = Points, GF = Goals for, GA = Goals against, PIM = Penalties in minutes

WHL Season	Team name	GP	W	L	T	Pts	GF	GA	PIM	Finish	Playoffs
1961–62	San Francisco Seals	70	29	39	2	60	229	270	580	Fourth in South	Lost quarter-final to Spokane Comets, 0–2
1962–63	San Francisco Seals	70	44	25	1	89	288	219	806	Second in South	Won quarter-final over Los Angeles Blades, 1–2; Won semi-final over Portland Buckaroos, 3–4; Won final over Seattle Totems, 3–4
1963–64	San Francisco Seals	70	32	35	3	67	228	262	758	Fourth in League	Won semi-final over Portland Buckaroos, 1–4; Won final over Los Angeles Blades, 2–4
1964–65	San Francisco Seals	70	31	37	2	64	255	283	933	Fifth in League	Out of playoffs
1965–66	San Francisco Seals	72	32	36	4	68	243	248	888	Fourth in League	Lost semi-final to Victoria Maple Leafs, 3–4
1966–67	California Seals	72	32	30	10	74	228	242	692	Fourth in League	Lost semi-final to Seattle Totems, 2–4

== See also ==
- California Golden Seals
- San Jose Sharks
