= Albany Academy (disambiguation) =

The Albany Academy is a school for boys in Albany, New York, US

Albany Academy may also refer to:

- Albany Academy for Girls, a school in Albany, New York, US
- Albany Academy, Chorley, a school in Chorley, Lancashire, England
- Albany Academy, Glasgow, a school in Glasgow, Scotland
- Albany Academy, the original name of Lewis & Clark College in Portland, Oregon, US

== See also ==
- The Albany Academies
- Old Albany Academy Building
