= The Albany Academies =

Independent school in Albany, New York, United States

Coordinates: 42.64585°N 73.78573°W

Albany Academy is an independent college-preparatory school in Albany, New York, educating students from pre-kindergarten through Grade 12. In July 2007, the administrative teams of The Albany Academy and Albany Academy for Girls merged into The Albany Academies. Over time, the schools adapted to become one institution, realigning campuses to provide the best possible experience for students. Beginning in the 2024-2025 academic year, the school launched a new brand and a singular name, Albany Academy. Christopher J. Lauricella is Head of School.

== Accreditation and memberships ==
Albany Academy is accredited by the New York State Association of Independent Schools and recognized by the Regents of the State of New York.

The Academy is a member of the following associations: the College Board, the Cum Laude Society, the National Association of Independent Schools, the Educational Records Bureau, the Capital Region Independent Schools Association, the Association of Boys' Schools, the Secondary Schools Admission Test Board, and the New England Prep School Athletic Association.

== See also ==
- The Albany Academy
- Albany Academy for Girls
- Albany, New York
