= Boston Latin School =

Magnet school in Boston, Massachusetts

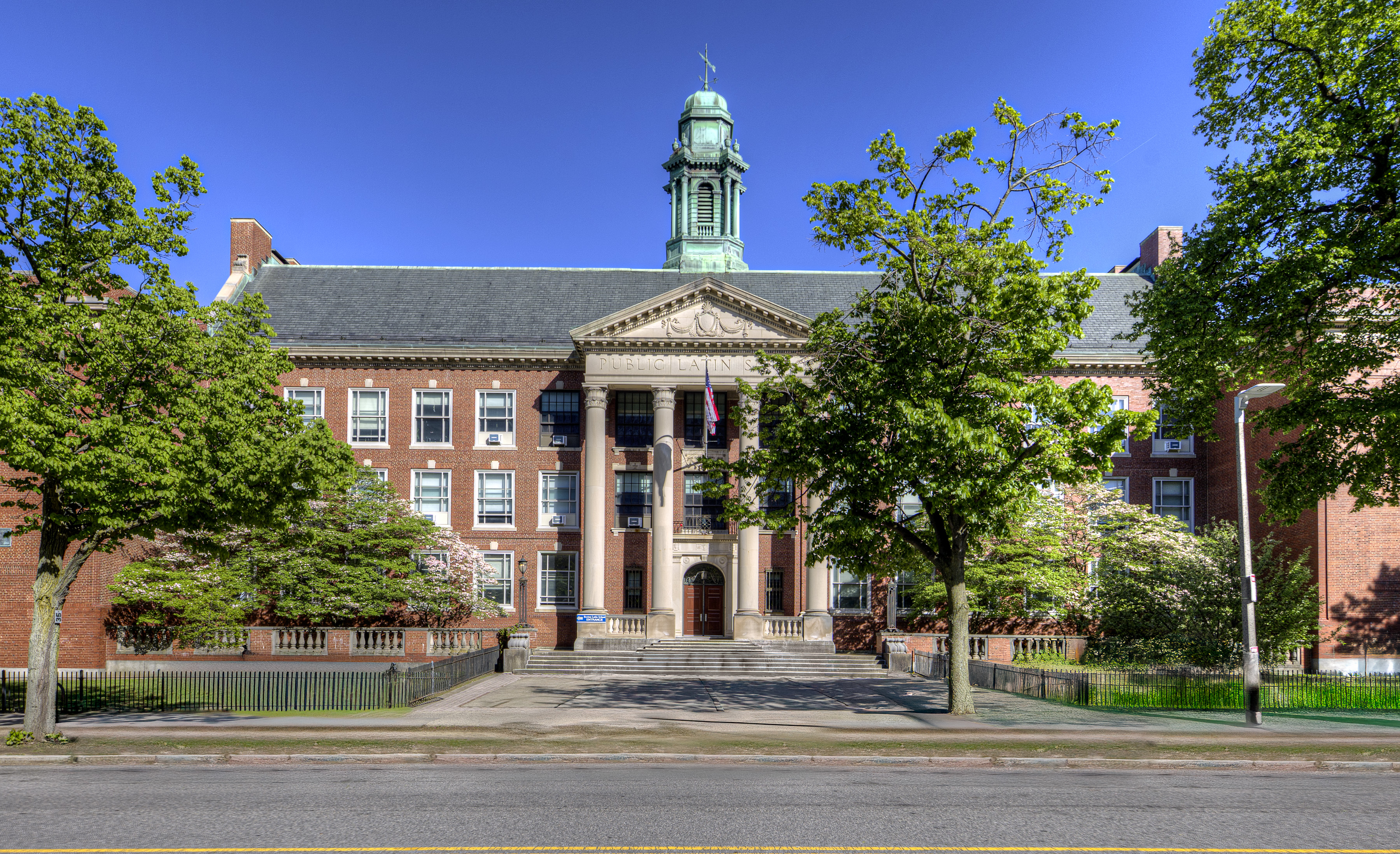

Location
- 78 Avenue Louis Pasteur; Boston, Massachusetts, 02115; United States; 42.338°N 71.102°W

Information
- Type: Public; magnet; Latin; grammar; selective school
- Motto: Sumus Primi (Latin) ("We are first")
- Established: April 23, 1635 (391 years ago)
- School district: Boston Public Schools
- Head of School: Jason Gallagher
- Teaching staff: 130.54 (FTE)
- Grades: 7–12
- Gender: Single-sex education only/mostly for males (from 1635 until 1972); Mixed-sex education (since 1972)
- Enrollment: 2,401 (2023–2024)
- Student to teacher ratio: 18.39
- Campus type: Urban
- Colors: Purple and White
- Athletics conference: Massachusetts Interscholastic Athletic Association (MIAA) District A – Dual County League
- Mascot: "Wolfie"
- Nickname: "The Wolfpack", "BLS"
- Rival: The English High School (Boston English)
- Accreditation: New England Association of Schools and Colleges (NEASC)
- Newspaper: The Argo
- Yearbook: Liber Actorum
- Website: bls.org

The Boston Latin School is a magnet Latin grammar state school in Boston, Massachusetts. It was established on April 23, 1635 and is the oldest public school in the United States.

== History ==
=== 17th and 18th centuries ===
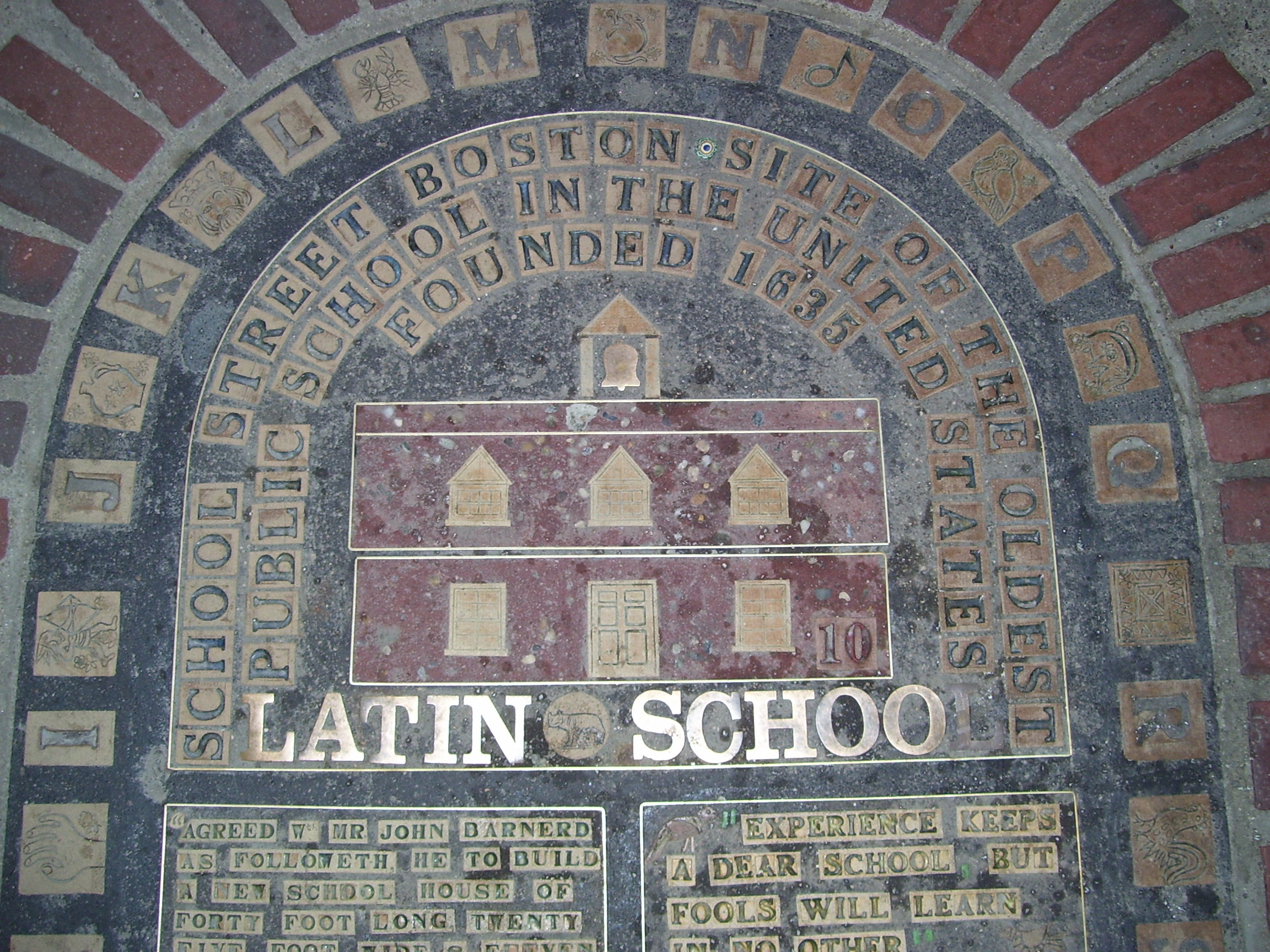
Plaque marking the site of the first BLS building on School Street

Boston Latin School was founded on April 23, 1635, by the Town of Boston. Under the auspices of Reverend John Cotton, the school was modeled after the Free Grammar School of Boston founded 80 years earlier in Boston, England. The first classes were held in the home of the Master, Philemon Pormort. John Hull was the first student to graduate (1637). It was intended to educate young men of all social classes in the classics. The school was initially funded by donations and land rentals rather than by taxes. A school established in nearby Dedham was the first tax-supported public school.

Latin is the mother of modern Romance languages and was an educational priority in the 17th century. The ability to read at least Cicero and Virgil was a requirement of all colonial colleges, and to write and speak Latin in verse and prose was the first of the “Harvard College Laws” of 1642. Boston Latin prepared many students for admission to Harvard, with a total of seven years devoted to the classics. However, most graduates of Boston Latin did not go on to college, since business and professions did not require college training.

Until the 19th century, the Latin School admitted only male students and hired only male teachers. Helen Magill White was the school's first female graduate and the first American woman to earn a doctorate. Magill White was the only female pupil at the school when she attended.

=== 19th century ===
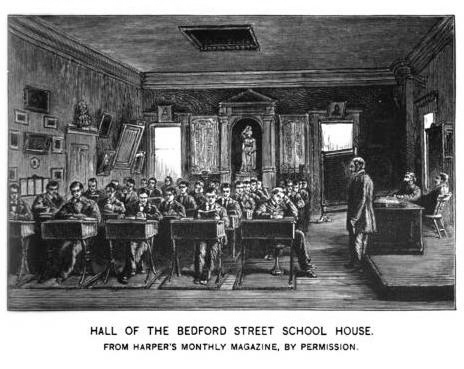
The old lecture hall on Bedford Street

Until the middle of the 19th century, BLS was popular among the Boston upper class. Under the headmastership of Epes Sargent Dixwell (1836–1851), the school moved into a new facility on Bedford Street. In 1844, Dixwell organized the Boston Latin School Association to support the school.

At mid-century, the City of Boston banned BLS from employing or teaching individuals who lived outside city limits. In response, Dixwell (who lived in Cambridge) broke away and started the Dixwell School, an exclusive private school that drew away affluent families from BLS.

In 1877, the Girls' Latin School was founded. A cadet corps was founded during the American Civil War but was later disbanded in the early 1960s.

=== 20th century ===
In 1967, the school appointed Marie Frisardi Cleary and Juanita Ponte as the first two women in its academic faculty. Cornelia Kelley was the school's first female headmaster, serving from 1998 until her retirement in 2007, after which Lynne Mooney Teta became headmaster. Boston Latin admitted its first co-educational class in 1972.

=== 21st century ===
In 2016, Mooney Teta resigned amid a federal probe into racially charged incidents at the school. In 2017, Rachel Skerritt became the first person of color to serve as headmaster. Skerritt resigned at the conclusion of the 2021–22 school year and was succeeded in the retitled position of Head of School by elementary principal and fellow Latin School alumnus Jason Gallagher.

=== Location history ===
Photo	Point	Coordinates (links to map & photo sources)	Notes
	First Boston Latin School House was a series of homes of each head master beginning with Philemon Pormort 1635 to 1638 and his successor Daniel Maude's home from 1638 to 1643. Ezekiel Cheever was an early head master of the Boston Latin School. He taught for seventy years, the last thirty-eight as master of the Boston Latin School. A formal single storey was the school's first permanent home from 1745 to 1812 to replace last temporary building which was demolished in 1745 to make way for King's Chapel expansion. Site was later used for Suffolk County Courthouse from 1810 to 1841, converted as City Hall until it was demolished and replaced by Old City Hall in 1865.	42.357909°N 71.059798°W	
	Second BLS school house on south side of School Street. Built in 1812 and demolished in 1844. Now site at 44 School Street is The Berluti and McLaughlin Building circa 1924.	42.357640°N 71.059679°W	
	Third BLS school house on Bedford Street was built 1844 and shared the site with English High School until 1881. Part of the site became home to R. H. White department store in 1876. It was torn down for a parking lot before becoming LaFayette Place Mall in 1984 (now Lafayette City Center complex).	42.353840°N 71.061060°W	
	Fourth location of BLS school house on Warren Avenue, (shared with the English High School of Boston), 1881–1922. Now site of the Melvin H. King South End Academy.	42.344178°N 71.073380°W	
	Fifth site of BLS school house on Avenue Louis Pasteur. 1922–present.	42.338017°N 71.102016°W	

== Academics ==
Boston Latin's motto is Sumus Primi, Latin for we are first. This has a double meaning, referring both to the school's date of founding and to its academic stature. Boston Latin has a history of pursuing the same standards as elite New England prep schools while adopting the egalitarian attitude of a public school. Academically, the school regularly outperforms public schools in affluent Boston suburbs, particularly as measured by the yearly MCAS assessment required of all Massachusetts public schools. In 2006, Brooklyn Latin School was founded in New York City, explicitly modeled on Boston Latin, borrowing much from its traditions and curriculum. In 2006, Washington Latin School was founded in Washington, D.C., also modeled on Boston Latin.

=== Admissions ===
Admission to Boston Latin School is limited to residents of the city of Boston. Until 2020, admission was determined by a combination of a student's score on the Independent School Entrance Examination (ISEE) and recent grades. As a result of the COVID-19 pandemic, however, the entrance exam was suspended, and admission was based on grades and Boston residency. In 2021, a new exam, the MAP Growth test, was designated for students applying for entrance to the 2023–24 school year and beyond. Students must have a grade point average from their current and previous school years of at least a B to be eligible to apply. In addition to GPA and test scores, students may be eligible to receive additional points if they meet specific criteria, such as living in housing owned by the Boston Housing Authority, in the care of the Department of Children and Families, or experiencing homelessness. They also receive additional points if they attended a school in the year prior to application that has, on average over the past five years, an enrollment of 40% or more economically disadvantaged students.

Although Boston Latin runs from the 7th through the 12th grade, it admits students only into the 7th and 9th grades.

The school has been the subject of controversy concerning its admissions process. Before the 1997 school year, Boston Latin set aside a 35% quota of places in the incoming class for under-represented minorities. The school was forced to drop this policy after a series of lawsuits were brought by white females who were not admitted despite ranking higher (based on test scores and GPA) than admitted minorities.

After the lawsuits, the percentage of under-represented minorities at Boston Latin fell from 35% in 1997 to under 19% in 2005, despite efforts by Boston Latin, the Boston Public Schools, and the Boston Latin School Association to recruit more minority applicants and retain more minority students.

Boston Latin later defeated a legal effort to end its admissions process entirely in favor of admissions by blind lottery.

In recent years, the admissions exam has continued to cause controversy due to the lack of diversity among admitted students. In 2017, Lawyers for Civil Rights published the demographics of the incoming class, highlighting that Black students are invited to attend Boston Latin at a rate that is more than two and a half times lower than their enrollment rates in Boston Public Schools overall.

Boston Public Schools' Student Demographics by Race (Updated 2021) From Massachusetts Department of Elementary and Secondary Education
1. African American (29.3%)
2. Asian (9.10%)
3. Hispanic (42.4%)
4. Native American (0.30%)
5. White (15.3%)
6. Native Hawaiian, Pacific Islander (0.20%)
7. Multi-Race, Non Hispanic (3.40%)

The following year in 2018, Harvard Kennedy School released a brief explaining possible reasons for the racial gap in Boston Latin School's admissions. Among the reasons are the lower rates of participation in the ISEE by Black and Hispanic students, lower ISEE scores due to inequitable curriculum and resources in the schools from which these students come, reported GPA differences, and less likelihood of Black and Hispanic students to list Boston Latin School as their top choice in school placement forms.

In 2019, Lawyers for Civil Rights, alongside the Boston chapter of the NAACP, sent a letter to Mayor Walsh, the Boston School Committee, and the superintendent, seeking to redo the admissions policies for Boston Latin School. The organizations cited the disproportionate admission rates of Black and Hispanic students versus white students as a failure of the exam system, and asked for a process that would diversify the school and take into account a student's personal achievements.

The Educational Records Bureau (ERB), the organization responsible for creating and updating the ISEE, reportedly decided to end its yearly contract with the Boston Public Schools (BPS) in April 2019. In an email sent to the school district and other clients, ERB claimed that the test's scoring metric had been incorrectly applied by BPS, resulting in underrepresented race groups failing to be admitted. BPS, however, denied that ERB cut business ties with the school district. BPS claimed instead that it had ended the contract in search of a test enabling “more equitable access” to the exam schools.

In October 2020, the Boston School Committee voted to cancel entrance exams for the city's three exam schools in 2021, due to the COVID-19 pandemic. The School Committee opted for an admissions procedure under which 20% of the incoming class would be accepted based on top grades, and the other 80% based on grades and zip codes. Students coming from zip codes with lower-income communities would receive preferential treatment.

Boston Latin School has received backlash from some parents because of this decision. Opponents of the proposed admissions system created a Change.org petition, garnering almost 6,000 signatures. The petition, directed to Boston City Council, argued that cancelling the test would increase disruption due to the COVID-19 pandemic. A protest was held prior to the vote on the steps of Boston Latin School. One common concern surrounded Chinatown students potentially being excluded based on Chinatown's surrounding area being rapidly gentrified, thus increasing the median income.

=== Curriculum ===
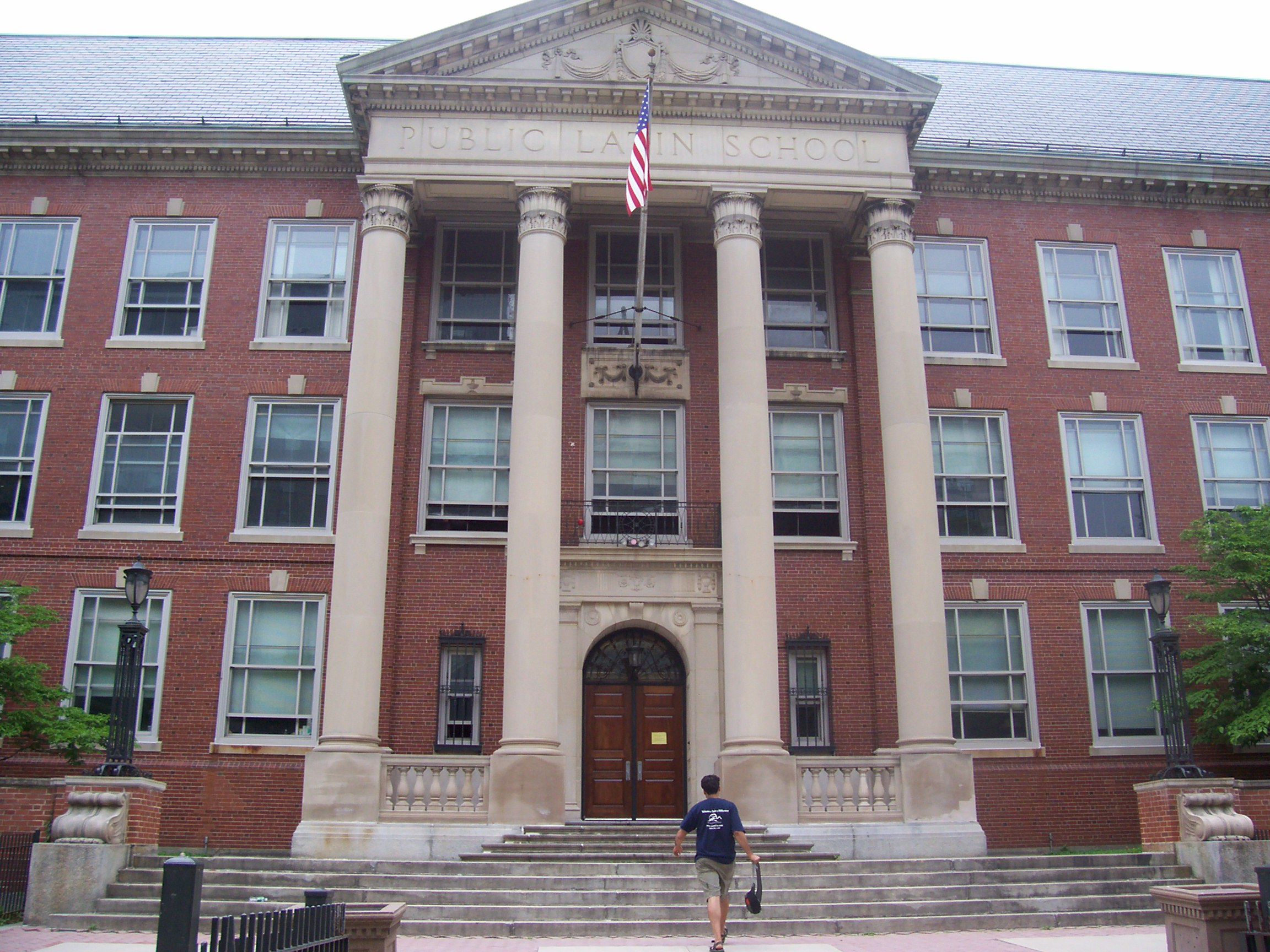
The school's front entrance on Avenue Louis Pasteur in 2007

Declamation is one of the school's time-honored traditions. Students in the 7th through 10th grades are required to give an oration, known as declamation, in their English class three times during the year. The school also holds Public Declamation, in which students from all grades are welcomed to try out for the chance to declaim a memorized piece in front of an assembly. During Public Declamation, declaimers are scored on categories including "Memorization," "Presentation," and "Voice and Delivery," and those who score well in three of the first four public declamations are given the chance to declaim in front of alumni judges for awards in "Prize Declamation.”

In addition to declamation in English classes, the Modern Languages department holds an annual "World Language Declamation" competition. Once a year, during National Foreign Language Week (usually the first week of March), students in grades 8 through 12 perform orations in languages other than English. Entrants are categorized by level, rather than language. So all students declaiming at the first-year level of various languages are competing against each other, all students declaiming at the second-year level compete against each other, and so on.

In 2001, the school decided to decrease the Latin requirement by one year, starting with the class of 2006. For students admitted for 7th grade, the minimum number of years of Latin required decreased from five years to four years, and for students admitted for 9th grade, from four years to three years. Students, however, can still take Latin (and Greek) electives after their fourth year.

== Publications ==
There are currently three main publications of the Boston Latin School: The Register is the school's literary magazine, The Argo the school newspaper, and Catapulta is the science magazine. George Santayana founded The Register in 1881 to serve as the school newspaper. Over the years, however, it evolved into a purely literary magazine, publishing prose and poetry written by members of the student body, as well as artwork. There are generally three editors-in-chief, and it is published twice per year. The Argo, the school's newspaper, is far younger, having been founded in 1970 after it was clear that the Register had become a purely literary magazine. As of the 2006–2007 school year, it is published seven times a year. Catapulta, the science magazine, highlights popular and recent science and technology and is generally published four times a year. The Register, the Argo, and Catapulta are entirely student-produced, and the "Argo" and the "Register" have won awards from the New England Scholastic Press Association, while Catapulta has won awards from the American Scholastic Press Association.

Another Boston Latin publication is "G Mello", published by the Boston Latin School Association, whose president is Peter G. Kelly, '83.

== Athletics ==
Boston Latin's teams are known as the Boston Latin Wolfpack; their colors are purple and white. Boston Latin has played rival Boston English in football every Thanksgiving since 1887, one of the oldest continuous high school rivalries in the United States.

In 2024, the Boys' Ice Hockey Team entered the state playoffs as the 11th seed and completed a magical Cinderella run by defeating the 10th, 6th, 3rd, and 1st ranked teams in the MIAA Division 2 on the way to winning the State Championship.

== In popular culture ==
- April 5, 2000: In "Six Meetings Before Lunch", a first-season episode of The West Wing, Rob Lowe's character Sam Seaborn mentioned Boston Latin School in a discussion of public school reform and school vouchers in American public education. He said, “Boston Latin, the oldest public school in America, is still the best secondary school in New England.” Mallory O'Brien replies "They all can't be Boston Latin and Bronx Science."
- January 8, 2002: President George W. Bush visited the Boston Latin School after signing the No Child Left Behind Act earlier that day.
- January 22, 2007: In Season 1, Episode 12 of Studio 60 on the Sunset Strip, Matthew Perry's character Matt Albie mentioned that his nephew had a 3.8 GPA at Boston Latin.

== Rankings and awards ==
In 2008, the school was named number 28 of public high schools in the United States by U.S. News & World Report magazine. It was named a 2011 "Blue Ribbon School of Excellence", the Department of Education's highest award. As of 2018, it is listed under the "gold medal" list, ranking 48 out of the top 100 high schools in the United States by U.S. News & World Report.

In 2024, the school was rated as the top public high school in Massachusetts by U.S. News & World Report and number 27 in national rankings.

== Alumni ==
Boston Latin has produced four Harvard University presidents, four Massachusetts governors, and five signers of the United States Declaration of Independence. Benjamin Franklin and Louis Farrakhan are among its well-known dropouts.

Boston Latin has graduated notable Americans in the fields of politics (both local and national), religion, science, journalism, philosophy, and music. Of the 56 men who signed the Declaration of Independence, five were educated at Latin: Adams, Franklin, Hancock, Hooper, and Paine. Graduates and students fought in the Revolutionary War, American Civil War, World War I, World War II, Korean War, and the Vietnam War, and plaques and statues in the school building honor those who died.

=== Hall of Fame ===
The Hall of Fame, known casually as "The Wall," refers to the upper frieze in the school's auditorium, where the last names of famous alumni are painted. These names include Adams, Bernstein, Fitzgerald, Franklin, Hancock, Hooper, John Hull, Kennedy, Mather, Paine, Quincy, Santayana, Winthrop and others. The most recent name, Wade McCree Jr., was added to the frieze in 1999, and the selection of the name involved a conscious effort to choose a graduate of color. There are no names of female graduates, mostly because women have attended the school for just 46 years and the honor is only bestowed posthumously. There is also a lower frieze with the names of many other distinguished graduates, and a place on the lower frieze can be awarded while the person is still alive.

== See also ==
- Brooklyn Latin School
- John D. O'Bryant School of Mathematics & Science
- List of the oldest public high schools in the United States
- Roxbury Latin School

Preceded by King's Chapel Burying Ground	Locations along Boston's Freedom Trail; Boston Latin School	Succeeded by Old Corner Bookstore
