= Dr. Hun Houses =

- Formerly listed on the U.S. National Register of Historic Places
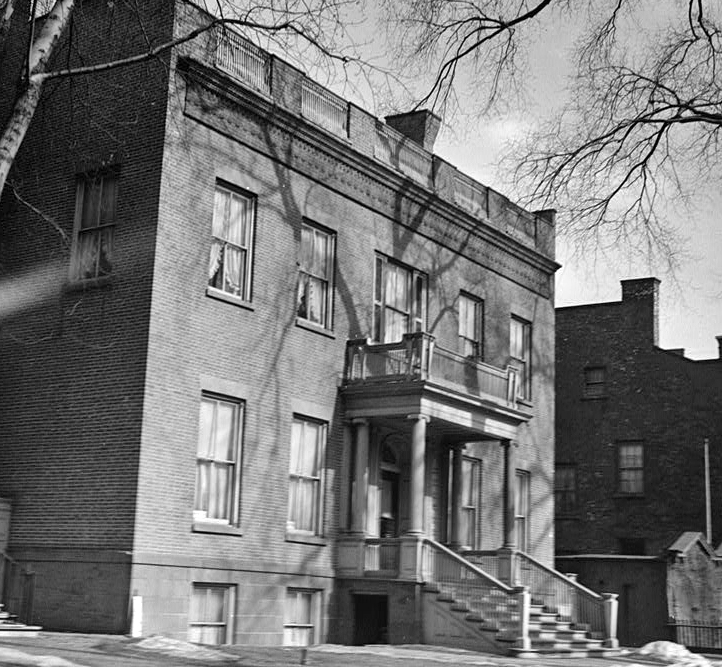
- Historic American Buildings Survey photo of 149 Washington Avenue, west profile and south elevation, 1934.

- Location within New York
- Location: Albany, NY
- Coordinates: 42°39′21″N 73°45′41″W
- Built: c. 1830 (149), 1920s (149 1/2)
- Architectural style: Federal style
- Demolished: 1972
- NRHP reference No.: 72001587

Significant dates
- Added to NRHP: September 19, 1972
- Removed from NRHP: December 11, 1972

The Dr. Hun Houses were located on Washington Avenue (New York State Route 5) on the western edge of central Albany, New York, United States. They were a pair of brick buildings constructed a century apart, the older one around 1830, in the Federal style. In 1972, three months after they were listed on the National Register of Historic Places, they were demolished and subsequently delisted.

The older house was considered one of the finest Federal homes in the city. Its architect is unknown, although it has been speculated to be Philip Hooker. It was likely built for John F. Bacon, a lawyer and clerk of the State Senate, who may only have lived there for a year and eventually sold it to another lawyer. Near the end of the 19th century, it was acquired by Dr. Henry Hun, who adapted the house for his practice and built a smaller, architecturally sympathetic house toward the rear of the property as a residence.

== Buildings ==
The two houses were on the same lot on the north side of Washington between Dove and Lark (U.S. Route 9W) streets in a densely developed urban neighborhood two blocks west of the state capitol, a National Historic Landmark. It is at the point where the large office and state government buildings that characterize the city's central development begin to yield to smaller residential and mixed-use buildings. The terrain is level, still rising gently towards the west from the Hudson River a mile (1.6 km) to the east, but less steeply than it does downtown.

There are several other Register-listed properties in the area. The Washington Avenue Armory is to the west. On the east end is the University Club of Albany, designed by Albert Fuller. The Albany Institute of History & Art, with a Marcus T. Reynolds-designed building, is across Dove from the University Club. Across the street is the Italianate Walter Merchant House, with Fuller's Harmanus Bleecker Library on the corner with Dove. Beyond them a block to the south is the large, primarily residential Center Square/Hudson–Park Historic District.

Large buildings like those mentioned dominate the block, as they did when the houses stood. To the north, across Elk Street, is a large parking lot; beyond it is Spruce Street and the ground's drop into the Sheridan Hollow neighborhood. West of Lark the buildings similarly drop in size.

The two houses were located near the front of the lot. The larger house, 149 Washington, had the same setback as the other buildings on the street, while the smaller, 149 1/2 Washington, was a little further back. In the rear was a lawn; a flagstone-paved parking area and garage gave egress to the Elk Street side of the property.

149 Washington was two and a half stories on the south (front) elevation and three and a half in the north, with an exposed basement. On both elevations it was five bays wide. It was built of brick laid in Flemish bond with wooden trim. The roof was flat in front and sloped in the rear. Inside end chimneys rose from the east and west.

The house's centrally located main entrance was sheltered by an elaborate wooden porch. Wooden steps with a railing rose from the street to a pair of round fluted Ionic columns on pedestals. They were echoed by similarly treated pilasters framing the doorway. Above them was a plain wooden entablature beneath a second-story balcony with balustrade.

Windows throughout the house were two-over-two double-hung sash with plain sandstone sills and lintels. The balcony window was flanked with wooden inset louvered shutters. Above the third floor windows was a decorative brick frieze and cornice, with another balustrade along the roofline. The north elevation featured a two-story porch which extended to the east side of the house. Three dormer windows pierced the south roof.

The doorway had an elliptical arch topped with a sunburst pediment. It opened into an interior with much of its original finishing remaining at the time of demolition. They included ornate woodwork, parquet floors, marble and wood mantels, and the light fixtures. Hun's office, in the southwest corner of the first floor, had a brass plaque with his name on the door. Inside were bookcases running the length of the walls, and prints of Albany street scenes set in the woodwork above the mantelpiece aside a Latin quotation.

The house at 149½ Washington is similar in overall design. It is a two-and-a-half-story building, three bays wide, of pressed brick, also in Flemish bond, with marble trim. On top is a roof similarly divided between a sloped front pierced by dormers and a flat rear. All windows were six-over-six double-hung sash with brick lintels and stone sills. Its front door also had an elliptical arch atop, but was trimmed in marble and topped with a triangular pediment. At the roofline was a dentilled stone cornice; a single chimney rose from the west profile. While it had been used as a medical office earlier in its history, at the time of demolition the Huns had subdivided it and were renting out apartments within. The interior plan reflected that conversion use.

== History ==
Two different versions have been offered of the early history of 149 Washington. The National Register nomination dates it to around 1830, identifying the owner as John F. Bacon, then a local lawyer and clerk of the state senate. Contemporary records show that he bought the property in 1828, and already owned the neighboring lot. The architect is, according to the nomination, unknown.

However, Herman Loth, who sketched and photographed the property in 1934 for the Historic American Buildings Survey, dates its construction to 1820. He identifies the first owner as a "Mr. Wood" and strongly believes the architect to have been Philip Hooker, designer of the original Albany Academy building in Academy Park, from the same era, and the First Church in Albany. "The characteristics of the interior unquestionably point to the fact that Philip Hooker was responsible for the design of the house if he was not actually the architect," he wrote in his report.

"Mr. Wood" seems to have been Bradford Wood, a younger lawyer who bought the house with his new wife, Eliza, from Bacon in late 1834. The older man had lived there for only one year, and then went to live at the boarding house where he and Wood had both previously lived. Over the 50 years that they lived in the house, the Woods gradually purchased all the land on the block between Dove, Elk, Lark and Washington, as the city slowly grew around and past it.

In 1892 another young professional, Henry Hun, bought the house with his new wife. The Huns would record an equally long tenure in the house. A physician and professor at what is today the Albany Medical College, he was from a prominent local family descended from the city's early Dutch settlers. He specialized in neurology, and after writing several early textbooks in the field chaired the American Neurological Association for two years. The house's proximity to what was then Albany Academy for Girls was also important to Hun, as he was an alumnus of the boys' school and chaired the combined schools' board of trustees for many years.

Shortly before his death in 1924 the second house, at 149½ Washington, was built when Hun's daughter Lydia married Kenneth Reynolds. Its similarities to the original house placed it firmly within the new Colonial Revival mode. Hun's new son-in-law, a second cousin to prominent Albany architect Marcus T Reynolds, was himself an architect and worked in his cousin's office at the time. He may have designed the house.

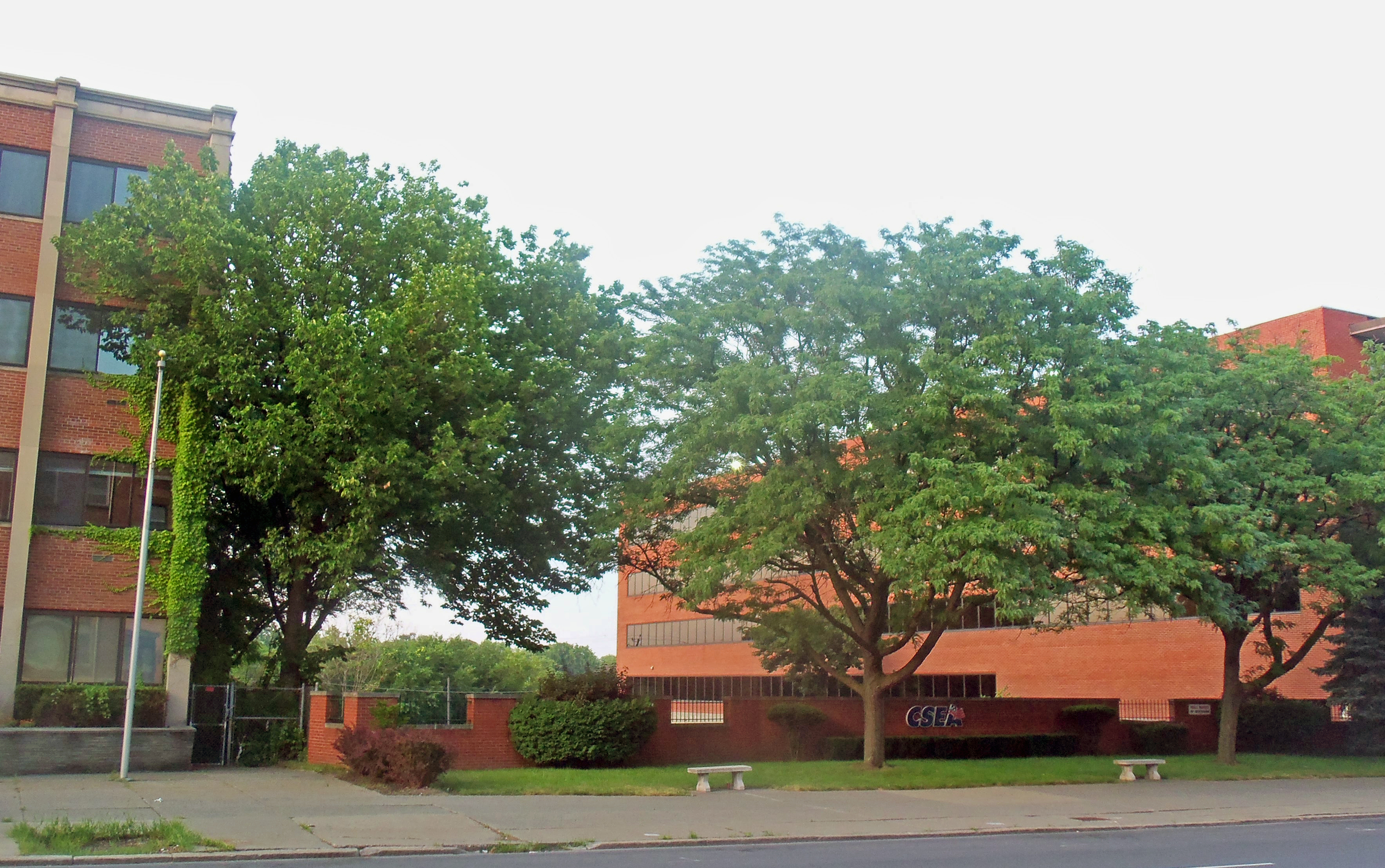
Site of the houses in 2013

Hun's own son, a physician also named Henry, moved into the main house and took over his father's practice the next year. He continued to live and work there until his own death in 1924. At some point the large rear porch was added to 149 Washington. After his death the houses were listed on the Register and then demolished. Nothing has been built on the site; it is a courtyard between the state headquarters of two large labor unions, the Civil Service Employees Association and Service Employees International Union.

== See also ==
- National Register of Historic Places listings in Albany, New York
