= Henry Hun =

American physician

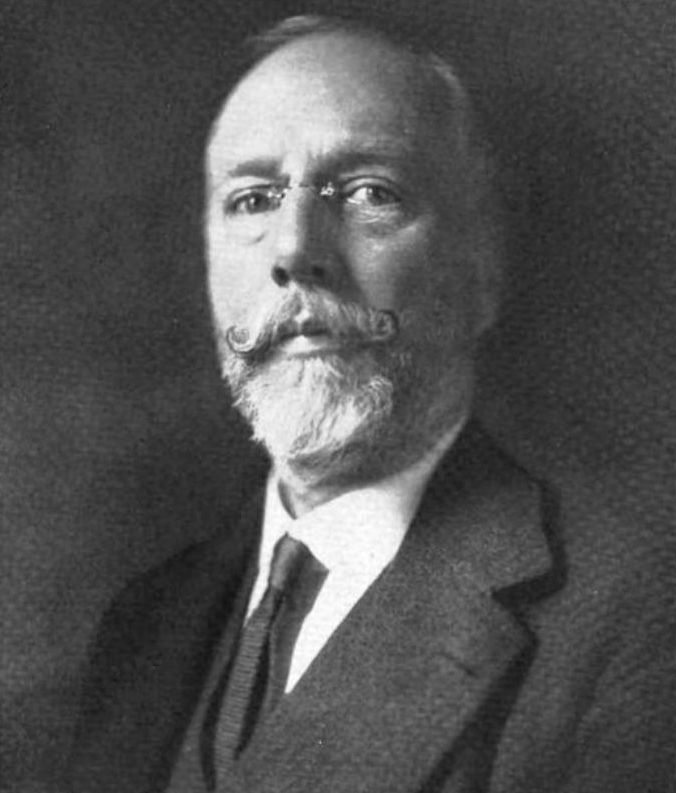
- Born: March 21, 1854; Albany, New York
- Died: March 14, 1924 (aged 69); Albany, New York
- Education: The Albany Academy; Sheffield Scientific School
- Occupation: Neurologist
- Spouse: Lydia Marcia Hand (m. 1892)
- Children: 3

Henry Hun (March 21, 1854 – March 14, 1924) was an American physician and professor of Nervous Diseases at Albany Medical College in New York for 30 years. He published several unique teaching volumes for his students as well as numerous journal articles on neurological disorders.

== Biography ==
Hun was born in Albany on March 21, 1854, the son of a physician. He attended The Albany Academy and received his bachelor degree from the Sheffield Scientific School of Yale University in 1874. He studied medicine at Harvard Medical School and earned his M.D. in 1879. He then spent two and a half years studying at numerous medical facilities in Germany, Vienna, Paris, and London. Union College (New York) conferred an honorary M.D. to him in 1883, and Yale University presented to him an honorary A.M. in 1914.

Hun was active in professional societies. He was president of the Albany Medical Society in 1892, vice president of the American Neurological Association in 1887, and its president in 1914. He was president of the Association of American Physicians in 1910. He was a member of the American Psychiatric Association and the New York State Medical Society. He served as an attending physician at the St. Peter's Hospital in Albany, the children's hospital at the Albany Medical Center, the Albany Hospital, and the Albany Hospital for Incurables, and served as a consultant to Brady Hospital and Maternity Home in Albany. His civic activities included the Board of Trustees of the Albany Academy, president of the Board of the Trustees of Dudley Observatory in Schenectady, New York, and Chairman of the Advisory Board of New York State No. 27 during World War I.

After his return from Europe, Hun published A Guide to American Medical Students in Europe in 1883. In his book, he provides detailed descriptions about the various medical facilities in Germany, Austria, Switzerland, and in Paris, London, and Dublin. He listed professors and their specialties, the courses offered, and details of travel and lodging. He wrote a textbook titled An Atlas of the Differential Diagnosis of the Diseases of the Nervous System. He published A Syllabus a Course of Lectures on the Diseases of the Nervous System, designed as a Note Book for the Use of Students, a two-volume book of his lectures to medical students. The Syllabus is unique in that they contain blank pages under various headings so that the student can enter the contents of his lectures. He was a co-editor of the journal, Albany Medical Annals, for many years.

He married Lydia Marcia Hand on April 28, 1892, and they had three children.

Hun died in his Albany home, the Dr. Hun Houses, a week before turning 70.

== Bibliography ==
- A Case of Pott's Disease, Presenting in the Arms Symptoms Resembling Those of Locomotor Ataxia, and in the Legs Those of Spinal Spasmodic Paralysis. 1888.
- A Guide to American Medical Students in Europe. Wm. Wood. 1883.
- An Atlas of the Differential Diagnosis of the Diseases of the Nervous Systems. 1913.
- A Syllabus of a Course of Lectures on the Diseases of the Nervous System: Designed as a Note-book for the Use of Students. Argus Company. 1907.
- Hun Henry (1914). "Clinical Studies of the Circulation with the Polygraph, especially in Regard to the Venous Pulse". Albany Medical Annals. 35 (1): 1–18.
- The Introductory Lecture Delivered at the Opening of the Sixty-sixth Session of the Albany Medical College, on Sept. 29, 1896: A Sketch of the Gradual Perfecting of the Methods of Medical Education in the Albany Medical College and in New York State During the 19th Century. 1896.
- The President's Address to the American Neurological Association: Read at the Meeting of the Association Held at Albany, N.Y., May 7th, 8th and 9th, 1914. 1914.
- The Outlines of Insanity. 1891.
