= Caroline B. Mason =

Caroline B. Mason was the Head of School for The Albany Academy (starting in 2003) and the Albany Academy for Girls (starting in 1993) in Albany, New York. She has the distinction of being the only person in the United States to head two schools simultaneously. In 2006, she announced her intention of stepping down from her posts following the 2006 - 2007 academic year.

== See also ==
- The Albany Academy
- Albany Academy for Girls
