= Capital Region Independent Schools Association =

The Capital Region Independent Schools Association (Crisa) includes 18 private, independent schools in the region of New York State.

- Academy of the Holy Names, Albany (Girls, Day, K-12, Roman Catholic)
- The Albany Academy, Albany (Boys, Day, K-12)
- Albany Academy for Girls, Albany (Girls, Day, K-12)
- Augustine Classical Academy, Mechanicville (Coed, Day, K-12, Classical & Christian)
- Bet Shraga Hebrew Academy of the Capital District, Albany (Coed, Day, K-8, Jewish)
- Bethlehem Children's School, Slingerlands (Coed, Day, K-8)
- Brown School, Schenectady (Coed, Day, PreK-12)
- Christian Brothers Academy, Colonie (Boys, Day, 6–12, Roman Catholic)
- Darrow School, New Lebanon (Coed, Boarding/Day, 9–12)
- Doane Stuart School, Rensselaer (Coed, Day, K-12)
- Emma Willard School, Troy (Girls, Boarding/Day, 9–12)
- Hoosac School, Hoosick, (Coed, Boarding/Day, 8–12, Episcopal)
- Loudonville Christian School, Loudonville (Coed, Day, PreK-12, Evangelical Christian)
- Montessori School of Albany, Rensselaer (Coed, Day, K-8)
- Our Savior's Lutheran School, Colonie (Coed, Day, PreK-8, Lutheran)
- Robert C. Parker School, Wynantskill (Coed, Day, K-8)
- St. Gregory's School for Boys, Loudonville (Boys, Day, K-8, Roman Catholic)
- Saratoga Independent School, Saratoga Springs (Coed, Day, K-8)
- Susan O'Dell Taylor School for Children, Troy (Coed, Day, K-5)
- Waldorf School of Saratoga Springs, Saratoga Springs (Coed, Day, K-12)
- Woodland Hill Montessori School, North Greenbush (Coed, Day, PreK-8)
