= Magdalene Merritt =

American poet

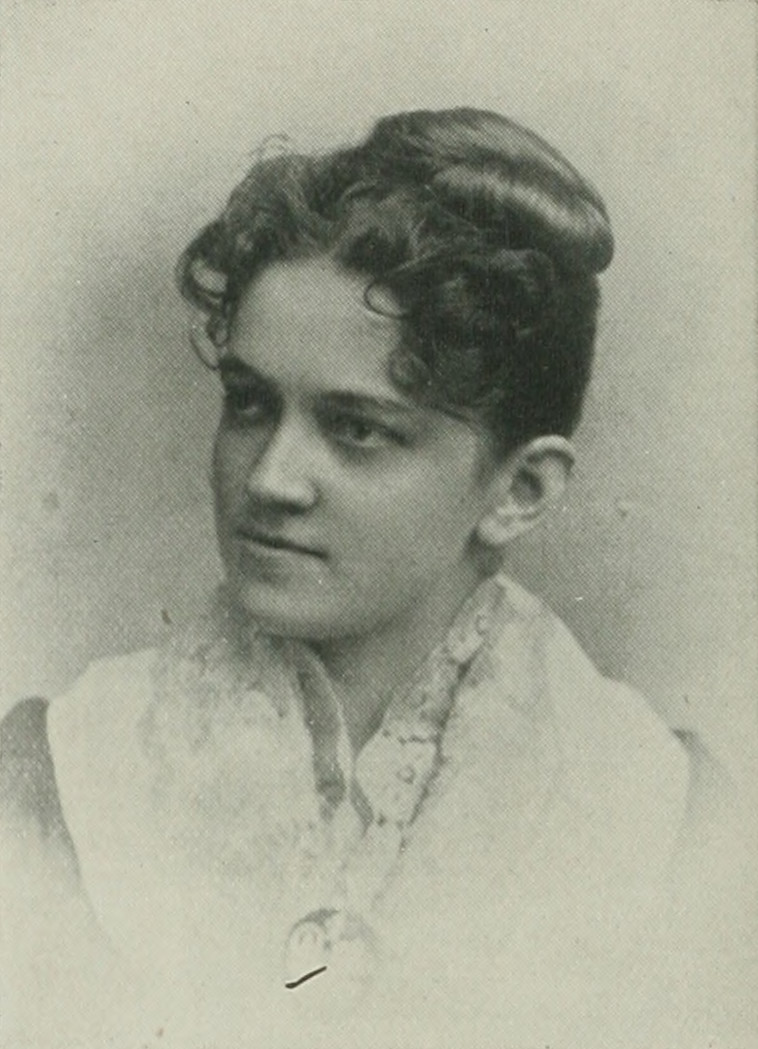
- "A Woman of the Century"
- Born: Magdalene Isadora La Grange; September 17, 1864; Guilderland, New York, US
- Died: 1935 (aged 70–71)
- Education: Albany Female College
- Occupation: poet
- Spouse: Aaron Merritt
- Writing career
- Notable works: Songs of the Helderberg; Helderberg harmonies

Signature
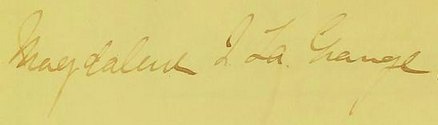

Magdalene Merritt (née, LaGrange; September 17, 1864 – 1935) was an American poet. She published two volumes, Songs of the Helderberg (1893) and Helderberg harmonies (1909).

== Early life and education ==
Magdalene Isadora La Grange was born in Guilderland, New York, September 17, 1864. Her parents were Myndert (1815-1892) and Julia Ann (1821-1902), second cousins of Count Johannes de la Grange who emigrated to the United States in 1656 from La Rochelle, France. Magdalene's siblings included, James, Andrew, Eleanor, Myndert, Vanderzee, Julia, Norman, Hester, Angelica, Ada, Harlan, Clinton, and Mary. Her family was of Huguenot origin. The ancestral home, "Elmwood Farm", was in the possession of the family for more than 200 years.

Merritt was educated in the Albany Female College, Albany, New York. She studied for three years with Prof. William P. Morgan.

== Career ==
She began at an early age to write prose articles for the press. Some of her early poems were published and were so well-received that she continued writing others. Her songs were of the plaintive kind, religious and subjective in tone. Merritt's poems appeared in the Springfield Republican, The American Agriculturist, Christian Work, Evangelist, and the Locomotive Engineers Journal. Her commemorative poem, "The Tried and True", was read aloud in Guilderland at services commemorating the town's history in 1890, 2003, and 2012.

Songs of the Helderberg

A poetry collection, Songs of the Helderberg, was issued in 1893, under her maiden name, and included her portrait on the frontispiece. A review of the collection by the Locomotive Engineers Journal (1893) mentioned,— "She generally choses simple themes, making them attractive with truth and deep feeling. One of the leading charms of her verse is its directness and simplicity of diction. the book is not only charming in itself, but interesting for its rich promise for the future."

Helderberg harmonies

She married Aaron Merritt of Voorheesville, locomotive engineer on the West Shore Railroad; they had no children. They lived on her farm, "Oak Knoll, located on the banks of the Normans Kill. Helderberg harmonies, published in 1909 under her married name, Magdalene Merritt, includes views of Helderberg by the landscape photographer, Clayton Le Gallez, of Albany.

== Selected works ==
=== Magdalene I. La Grange ===
- Songs of the Helderberg, 1893 (Text)

=== Magdalene Merritt ===
- Helderberg harmonies, 1909 (Text)
