= Harriet Mabel Spalding =

American poet (1862–1935)

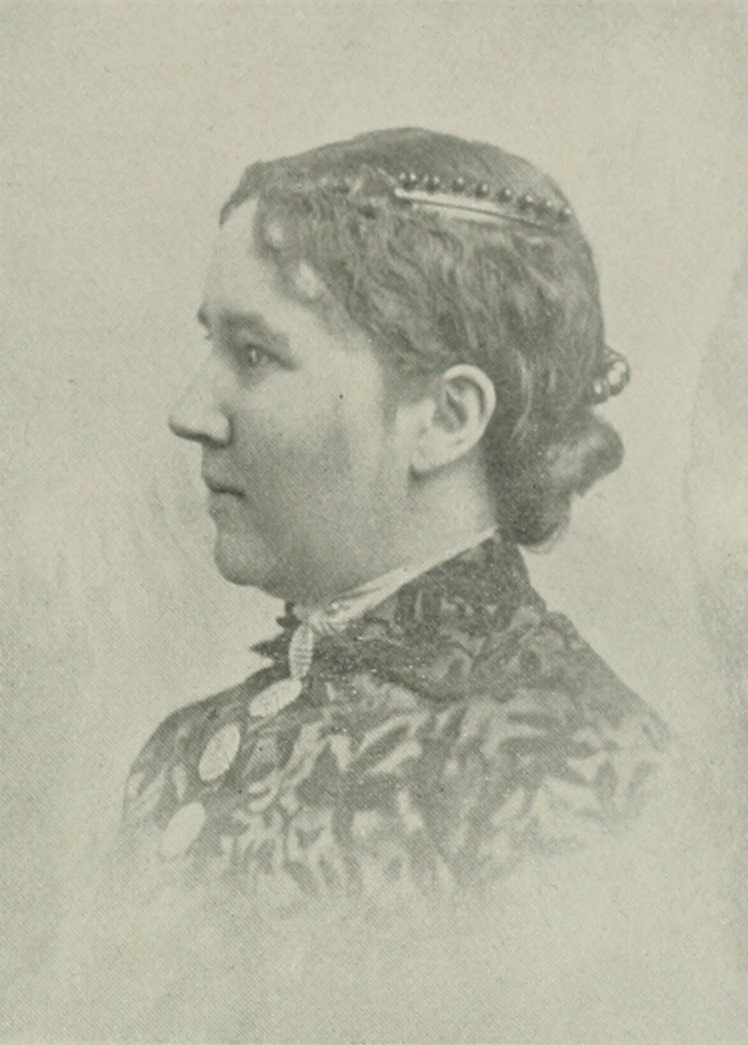
- Photo in A Woman of the Century
- Born: January 10, 1862; Gloversville, New York, U.S.
- Died: August 14, 1935 (aged 73); Schenectady, New York, U.S.
- Resting place: Albany Rural Cemetery, Menands, New York, U.S.
- Education: Albany Female Academy
- Occupations: poet, litterateur
- Writing career
- Language: English

Signature
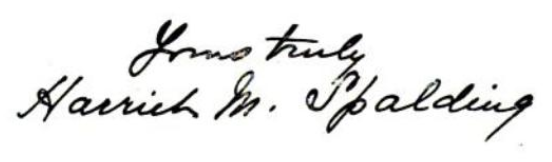

Harriet Mabel Spalding (January 10, 1862 – August 14, 1935) was an American poet and litterateur from New York, who began writing verses at the age of nine. The author of a volume of poetry, her work was widely published and copied.

== Early life and education ==
Harriet Mabel Spalding (sometimes misspelled "Spaulding") was born in Gloversville, New York, January 10, 1862. She was the daughter of Rev. N. G. Spalding, a clergyman in the Troy conference of the Methodist Episcopal Church. He was an orator, and a graduate of Union College. Her mother, Harriet Dorr, was an artist and a graduate of Mrs. Willard's Troy Seminary. Harriet had three siblings: Dorr Spalding, Dr. Warren Clyde Spalding, and Nathaniel Bull Spalding.

In 1868, the family removed to Schodack Landing, New York where Harriet was educated. In 1877, she graduated from the Albany Female Academy, where she won six gold medals in various branches of composition.

== Career ==
Spalding began writing verses at the age of nine years. She wrote much and her work was widely copied.

Spalding became well known in art and literature circles in Albany, New York, Chicago, and New York City. She was the author of a volume of poems.

In 1887, she served as president of the Albany Female Academy's Alumnae Association.

== Death ==
She died August 14, 1935, in Schenectady, New York, and was buried at Albany Rural Cemetery, Menands, New York.
