= Independent School Entrance Examination =

American school entrance exam

The Independent School Entrance Examination (ISEE) is an entrance exam used by many independent schools and magnet schools in the United States. Developed and administered by the Educational Records Bureau (ERB), the ISEE has four levels: the Primary level, for entrance to grades 2–4; Lower level, for entrance in grades 5–6; Middle level, for entrance in grades 7–8; Upper level, for entrance in grades 9–12. All levels consist of five sections: Verbal Reasoning, Quantitative Reasoning, Reading Comprehension, Mathematics Achievement, and a 30-minute essay. The ISEE can be seen as a parallel to the Secondary School Admission Test, or SSAT. It is currently administered by Measurement Incorporated.

== Verbal reasoning ==
This section consists of two parts: synonyms and sentence completions. Both parts measure the student’s vocabulary level and reasoning ability. The Synonym section assesses the student’s ability to pick, out of four options, a word with a similar meaning to the one in question. The Sentence Completion section assesses the student’s ability to complete a sentence logically by picking the correct word out of the four options presented. On the Upper and Middle Levels there are 40 questions to be answered in 20 minutes. On the Lower Level there are 34 questions to be answered in 20 minutes.

== Quantitative reasoning ==
On the Lower Level, there are 38 questions to be answered in 35 minutes. On the Upper and Middle Levels, there are 37 questions to be answered in 35 minutes. The Lower Level consists of Word Problems, and the Middle and Upper levels consist of Word Problems and Quantitative Comparisons.

All questions found in the two math sections of the ISEE are linked to the National Council of Teachers of Mathematics (NCTM) Standards. The ISEE uses the following NCTM strands as a basis for the Quantitative Reasoning section:

- Numbers and Operations
- Algebra
- Geometry
- Measurement
- Data Analysis and Probability
- Problem Solving

== Reading comprehension ==
On the Lower Level, there are 25 questions to be answered in 25 minutes. On the Middle and Upper levels, there are 36 questions to be answered in 35 minutes.

The Lower Level contains five reading passages, each followed by five questions. The Middle and Upper levels contain six reading passages, each followed by six questions. The passages include topics related to history, science, literature, and contemporary life.

The types of questions focus on six categories:

- Main Idea
- Supporting Ideas
- Inference
- Vocabulary
- Organization/Logic
- Tone/Style/Figurative Language.

== Mathematics achievement ==
There are 30 questions to be answered in 30 minutes on the Lower level, and 47 questions to be answered in 40 minutes on the Middle and Upper levels.

As with the questions in the Quantitative Reasoning section, this section will include questions from NCTM standards.

== Essay ==
On all three levels, candidates must plan and write an essay to provide a sample of his or her writing to schools to which the candidate is applying. A random topic is distributed, and students have 30 minutes to write an essay using a black or blue pen. The essay is not scored, but is photocopied and sent to schools to which the student is applying.

== Breaks ==
On all three levels, students are given two five-minute breaks when they take the ISEE. One is after the Quantitative Reasoning section and the other is after the Mathematics Achievement Section. During the breaks, students may use the restroom, talk, eat food, or walk around the room. However, students are not permitted to discuss the test.

== See also ==
- Educational Records Bureau (ERB)
- Education in the United States
- List of standardized tests in the United States
