= Albany Academy for Girls =

College-prep school in Albany, New York, US

Coordinates: 42.64558°N 73.78409°W

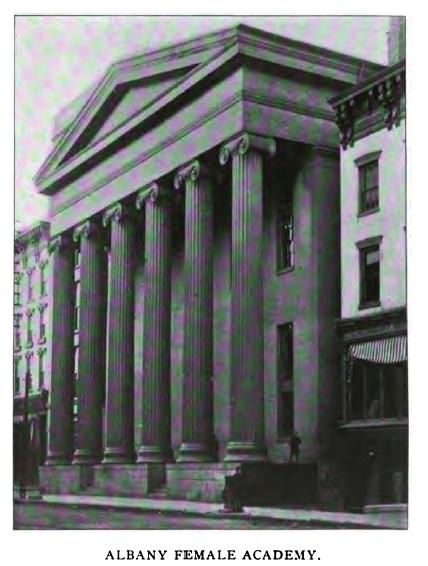
- Albany Female Academy building, c. 1901

Location
- 140 Academy Rd; Albany, New York 12208; United States

Information
- Type: Private, College-prep, Day
- Established: 1814; 212 years ago
- Head of school: Christopher J. Lauricella
- Grades: P–12
- Gender: Girls
- Enrollment: 315
- Average class size: 15 students
- Student to teacher ratio: 10:1
- Campus size: 22 acres (89,000 m^{2})
- Campus type: Suburban
- Colors: Blue and Gold
- Athletics: 10 interscholastic sports teams
- Athletics conference: NEPSAC
- Team name: Bears
- Tuition: $15,700-$43,400
- Affiliation: The Albany Academies; NYSAIS
- Website: found

Albany Academy for Girls is an independent college-preparatory day school for girls in Albany, New York, United States, enrolling students from preschool (age 3) to grade 12. Founded in 1814 by Ebenezer Foote as the Albany Female Academy, AAG is the oldest independent girls day school in the United States. It is located on the corners of Hackett Boulevard and Academy Road, across the street from its brother school The Albany Academy.

In July 2007, the administrative teams of The Albany Academy and Albany Academy for Girls merged into The Albany Academies. In 2024, the school continued its campus realignment efforts and launched a rebrand of the unified school as "Albany Academy."

== Collaboration with The Albany Academy ==
The Board of Trustees announced that The Albany Academy and Albany Academy for Girls would merge into The Albany Academies in July 2007. In 2024, the school continued campus realignment efforts and became known as Albany Academy. Single-gender education will continue in the Middle School, while Lower School and Upper School students are now co-educational. Christopher Lauricella currently serves as the Head of School.

== Accreditation and memberships ==
The Albany Academies are accredited by the New York State Association of Independent Schools and recognized by the Regents of the State of New York. The Albany Academies are a member of the following associations: the College Board, the Cum Laude Society, the National Association of Independent Schools, the Educational Records Bureau, the Capital Region Independent Schools Association, the Association of Boys' Schools, the Secondary Schools Admission Test Board, and the New England Prep School Athletic Association.

== Alumni ==
Notable alumnae include:

- Anne Lynch Botta, poet, author, teacher, socialite
- Magdalene Isadora La Grange, poet
- Mary Gardiner Horsford, poet
- Mary Blanchard Lynde, philanthropist and social reformer
- Mary Margaretta Fryer Manning, socialite
- Jane Stanford, co-founder of Stanford University alongside her husband Leland Stanford
- Elise Stefanik, politician
- Rev. Caroline Soule, first woman ordained in the UK
- Harriet Mabel Spalding, litterateur, poet

== Faculty/administration ==
- John Chester, second president of Rensselaer Polytechnic Institute
- John Ely, U.S. Representative from New York
- Doris Grumbach, novelist, biographer, literary critic, and essayist She died in 2022
- Eben Norton Horsford, chemist and Viking enthusiast
- Caroline B. Mason, educator, the only person in the United States to head two schools simultaneously
- Anne Montgomery, RSCJ, non-violent activist and educator

== In media ==
- In The Official Preppy Handbook, edited by Lisa Birnbach, an Albany Academy for Girls admissions pamphlet is pictured among others in a section titled "Preparing to Prep: Picking the School for You"
