= The Enrollment Management Association =

The Enrollment Management Association, formerly known as the Secondary School Admission Test Board (SSATB), is a nonprofit organization founded in 1957 in the United States by independent school admission officers with three goals in mind: to provide a forum for exchange and support among admission professionals, to create an admission test for use by private schools, and to assist parents and students in their independent school search.

The Enrollment Management Association is a member organization servicing enrollment management professionals in more than 900 independent schools and organizations. The association offers a wide range of professional development services including webinars, special reports, and regional meetings. In addition, The Enrollment Management Association hosts the industry's largest annual conference focused exclusively on peer networking, information, and training.

The Enrollment Management Association develops and administers the Secondary School Admission Test (SSAT) to connect to and support the overall independent school admission process. Each year, the SSAT is administered to more than 75,000 testers in hundreds of test locations around the world. The association provides member schools with perspectives and data on an applicant’s potential academic success, as well as a school’s applicant pool, competitive position, and potential market position through a variety of school-specific data studies and numerous survey and research-based reports.

The Enrollment Management Association also provides a Standard Application Online (SAO) to families and member schools, comparable to higher education’s Common Application. Students have submitted more than 150,000 applications to independent/private schools around the world using the Standard Application Online. The SAO allows students to apply online to multiple member schools through a web-based interface that houses biographic information, teacher recommendations, essays, and more.

== Board of trustees ==
The Enrollment Management Association's Board of trustees is made up of independent school professionals, leaders in the testing field, and others who support independent education.

== Admission Leadership Council ==
The Admission Leadership Council (ALC) was founded in 2009 to establish a consistent organizational and professional voice for members. The role of the ALC is to be a sounding board for the development of The association's services, to provide leadership in the area of professional development, and to act as advocates for the critical role of admission in schools. The ALC members provide a monthly blog, entitled Right on Time, give webinars throughout the admission season, and host a variety of regional seminars each year.

== Think Tank on the Future of Assessment ==
The Think Tank on the Future of Assessment created an ongoing conversation about 21st century admission and the needs of enrollment managers during the selection process. They produced two seminal reports on the development and research of non-cognitive assessment, leading to the development of the Character Skills Snapshot, a groundbreaking non-cognitive assessment tool for admission.

== Annual Conference and Professional Training ==
In 2019, the Annual Conference is being held in Washington, DC, from September 11–14. The Enrollment Management Association also offers the Admission Training Institute (ATI) and the Admission Directors Institute (ADI) prior to the Annual Conference. These programs are designed specifically for newcomers to the profession and new admission directors, respectively. Additionally, there are multiple tracks offered focusing on marketing, data and finance, leadership, and assessment. A Senior Track is provided Enrollment Management Think Tank for those with extensive experience in enrollment management. EMA also partners with The Association of Boarding Schools (TABS) and The Erdmann Institute to provide training for mid-to-senior level enrollment professionals at the annual Erdmann Institute. The association's Mentorship Initiative provides newcomers to admission with an experienced, dedicated mentor.

== Executive Director ==
The current executive director is Heather Hoerle, former Vice President, Member Relations for the National Association of Independent Schools (NAIS). Hoerle became the executive director in April 2011. Since then, The Enrollment Management Association has restructured the organization’s management, completed an IT infrastructure rebuild to modernize operations, enhanced test development processes and procedures, launched an Elementary Level SSAT, completely rebranded and repositioned the association, and published groundbreaking research in the field of enrollment management.

== Enrollment Management Think Tank ==
Enrollment management is the #1 issue facing independent schools, and admission directors are the front line in dealing with this challenging and complex issue. In an effort to support its members, The Enrollment Management Association convened an Enrollment Management Think Tank to investigate pressing issues, to provide information to the larger independent school community, and to present The Enrollment Management Association’s board of directors with summary thinking and a set of recommendations. Chaired by two respected independent school admission professionals— Jim Ventre, Dean of Admission and Financial Aid, Phillips Academy (MA), and Jill Lee, Director of Admission and Tuition Assistance, Castilleja School (CA)—the group will work to:

• Identify a set of research questions about enrollment management

• Scan the environment of independent schools, higher education, and business/industry for current practices and innovations in recruitment, selection, and retention

• Talk to top researchers and practitioners in the field

• Publish findings and make recommendations to The Enrollment Management Association board of directors

Supported by Senior Director of Outreach and Business Development Aimee Gruber, the EMTT will conduct high level “discovery” about key strategic issues affecting the enrollment health of private schools.
