= Secondary School Admission Test =

American standard test for grades 3–11

- Acronym: SSAT
- Type: Paper-based or computer-based standardized test
- Administrator: E3n
- Skills tested: Writing, critical reading, mathematics
- Purpose: Admission to independent and private schools
- Year started: 1957; 69 years ago
- Duration: Middle and Upper Levels: 3 hours 10 minutes Elementary Level: 2 hours 5 minutes
- Score range: Upper Level: 500–800 (total 1500–2400); Middle Level: 440–710 (total 1320–2130); Elementary Level: 300–600 (total 900–1800)
- Offered: 6 times annually
- Regions: United States, Canada and international test centers
- Languages: English
- Annual number of test takers: 50,000 annually
- Fee: US$112 to US$229
- Used by: Independent and private schools
- Website: www.admission.org/assessments/ssat/about-the-ssat

The Secondary School Admission Test (SSAT) is an admission test administered by The Enrollment Management Association in the United States to students in grades 3–11 to provide a standardized measure that will help professionals in independent or private elementary, middle, and high schools to make decisions regarding student test taking.

There are three levels of the test: the Elementary Level (EL), for students in grades 3 and 4 who are applying to grades 4 and 5; the Middle Level, for students in grades 5–7 applying for grades 6–8; and the Upper Level, designed for students in grades 8–11 who are applying for grades 9–12 (or PG, the Post-Graduate year before college). The SSAT consists of a brief unscored writing sample and multiple choice sections comprising quantitative (mathematics), reading comprehension, and verbal questions. An experimental section at the end is unscored. The test, written in English, is administered around the world at hundreds of test centers, many of which are independent schools. Students may take the exam on any or all of the eight standard test dates; the SSAT "Flex" test, given on a flexible date by approved schools and consultants, can be taken only once per testing year (August 1 – July 31).

Although each year several different SSAT forms are utilized, the SSAT is administered and scored in a consistent (or standard) manner. The reported scores or scaled scores are comparable and can be used interchangeably, regardless of which test form students take. This score interchangeability is achieved through a statistical procedure referred to as score equating. Score equating is used to adjust for minor form difficulty differences so that the resulting scores can be compared directly.

The SSAT measures verbal, quantitative, and reading skills that students develop over time, both in and out of school. The overall difficulty level of the SSAT is built to be at 50–60%. The distribution of question difficulties is set so that the test will effectively differentiate test takers by ability. The SSAT is developed by review committees composed of standardized test experts and select independent school teachers.

== Test sections ==
=== Quantitative ===
In the Middle and Upper Level SSATs, there are two 30-minute quantitative sections with 25 math questions each. The quantitative questions measure the test taker’s knowledge of basic quantitative concepts, algebra, and geometry. The words used in SSAT problems refer to basic mathematical operations. Many of the questions that appear in the quantitative sections of the Middle Level SSAT are structured in mathematical terms that directly state the operation needed to determine the best answer choice. The challenge is to figure out what the question is asking. Some of the wording can be misleading. Other questions are structured as word problems. A word problem often does not specifically state the mathematical operation(s) to perform in order to determine the optimal answer. Often it is difficult to choose between two very similar solutions. Sometimes test takers must re-read the problem to distinguish between the correct answer; this is time consuming.

The quantitative section of the EL SSAT consists of thirty quantitative items. These items are a mixture of concepts that are considered to be the basis of the third and fourth grade mathematics curricula and a few that will challenge the third- or fourth-grade student. These include questions on number sense, properties, and operations; algebra and functions; geometry and spatial sense; measurement; and probability.

=== Reading Comprehension ===
In the Middle and Upper Level SSATs, the 40-minute reading comprehension section has 40 questions based on reading passages. These questions measure the test taker’s ability to understand what is read in the section. In general, the SSAT uses two types of writing: narrative, which includes excerpts from novels, poems, short stories, or essays; and argument, which presents a definite point of view about a subject. By presenting passages and questions about the passages, the reading comprehension section measures a test taker's ability to understand what he or she read. Following each passage are questions about its content or about the author’s style, intent, or point of view. The passages are chosen from a variety of categories, including, but not limited to: humanities: art, biography, poetry, etc.; social studies: history, economics, sociology, etc.; and science: medicine, astronomy, zoology, etc.

In the Elementary Level SSAT the reading section consists of seven short, grade-level–appropriate passages, each with four multiple-choice questions. These passages may include prose and poetry as well as fiction and nonfiction from diverse cultures. Students are asked to locate information and find meaning by skimming and close reading. They are also asked to demonstrate literal, inferential, and evaluative comprehension of a variety of printed materials. Questions ask the reader to show understanding of key ideas and details to determine the main idea of the text. Additionally, they ask the reader to determine the meaning of words and phrases as they are used in a text, distinguishing literal from non-literal language.

The reading comprehension section of the SSAT guides schools in placing students in appropriate classes. However, not all schools require an SSAT score, and few schools use the SSAT to judge the students academic skills, so the reading comprehension test does not help unless it is an independent school judging a students academic skills by the SSAT.

=== Verbal ===
SSAT Verbal Reasoning is the first and fastest section in the test. Verbal reasoning is mainly understanding and reasoning using concepts expressed in words. It aims at assessing the ability to think constructively, rather than at simple fluency or vocabulary recognition. This section of the test is composed of two parts – synonyms and sentence completions. It takes 30 minutes to complete the 30 Synonym Questions and 30 Sentence Completion Questions. These questions test students' familiarity with vocabulary and their ability to apply that knowledge. Outside of the test, verbal reasoning skills allow students to understand and solve complicated subject questions and perform logical reasoning.

Synonym questions in the SSAT look like this:

CELEBRATE:

(A) align

(B) fathom

(C) rejoice

(D) salivate

(E) appreciate

In this case, the answer would be (C).

Analogy questions in the SSAT look like this:

Dog is to Puppy as

(A) Lion is to Lioness

(B) Cat is to Kitten

(C) Monkey is to Ape

(D) Rabbit is to Carrot

(E) Cello is to violin

In this case, the answer would be (B).

On the Middle and Upper Level SSATs, the verbal section is 30 minutes long and consists of 30 synonym and 30 analogy questions. It asks students to identify synonyms and to interpret analogies. The synonym questions test the strength of the students' vocabulary, while the analogy questions measure their ability to logically relate ideas to one another.

Analogies are a comparison between two things that are usually seen as different from each other but have some similarities. They act as an aid to understanding things by making connections and seeing relationships between them based on knowledge already possessed. Comparisons like these play an important role in improving problem-solving and decision-making skills, in perception and memory, in communication and reasoning skills, and in reading and building vocabulary. Analogies help students to process information actively, make important decisions, and improve understanding and long-term memory. Considering the relationships stimulates critical and creative thinking.

Elementary Level SSAT: The verbal section of the EL SSAT has two parts. The first is a vocabulary section and the second is an analogies section. These sections test understanding of language, word relationships, and nuances in word meanings by relating them to words with similar but not identical meanings (synonyms).

=== Writing Sample ===
In the writing sample section of the Middle and Upper Level SSATs, test takers are given 2 pages and a choice of two writing prompts: Middle Level test takers receive a choice of two creative prompts, and Upper Level test takers receive one essay and one creative prompt from which to choose. The writing sample section is 25 minutes long and is not scored. However, the writing sample is sent to school admission officers along with the scores of the other sections of the test.

In the elementary level SSAT, the writing sample gives students an opportunity to express themselves in response to a picture prompt. Students are asked to look at an image and tell a story about what happened.

Test takers will not receive the essay results unless purchased separately.

== Scoring ==
In the Upper and Middle Level SSATs, formula scoring is used, with students receiving 1 point for each question answered correctly, losing one-quarter point for each question answered incorrectly, and neither losing nor gaining points for questions left unanswered. This disincentivizes guessing. The Elementary Level SSAT does not use formula scoring, instead giving 1 point for each correct answer and 0 points for each incorrect/incomplete answer. The SSAT is designed so that students should be able to reach all questions on the test.

=== Scaled scores ===
SSAT scores are broken down by section (verbal, quantitative/math, reading). A total score (a sum of the three sections) is also reported.

For Elementary Level SSAT sections, the lowest number on the scale (300) is the lowest possible score a student can earn, and 600 is the highest. The combined lowest possible score is 900, the highest 1800, with a midpoint of 1350. The experimental section (15–17 for elementary and 16 questions for middle and upper levels) is not graded.

For Middle Level SSAT sections, the scale ranges from 440 to 710. The lowest possible total score is 1320, the most 2130.

For Upper Level SSAT sections, the scale ranges from 500 to 800. The lowest possible combined score is 1500, the highest 2400, and the median 1950.

=== Percentile ===
The SSAT Percentile (1 to 99) compares the student's performance on the SSAT with that of other students of the same grade and gender who have taken the SSAT in the U.S. and Canada on a standard test date in the previous three years.

Test takers may send their results to the independent schools they wish to apply to at any time. There is no charge for sending scores to schools through an online SSAT account. Students may report only the scores they wish for a school to see. The score report does not indicate if a student has tested multiple times or with testing accommodations. Scores are released approximately 2 weeks after testing.

Each school evaluates the scores according to its own standards and requirements.
