= Educational Records Bureau =

- Formation: 1927; 99 years ago
- Legal status: Private, nonprofit
- Headquarters: New York, NY, U.S.
- Products: Independent School Entrance Examination (ISEE); Comprehensive Testing Program (CTP)
- Members: 2000 schools
- Website: http://ERBlearn.org

Educational Records Bureau (ERB) is a private, American educational nonprofit organization that provides standardized tests for both admissions (entrance exams) and annual assessments for 2,000 private and selective public schools during pre-K to grade 12.

== History ==
ERB was founded in 1927, and is headquartered in New York City with over 2000 member schools globally.

The organization is governed by a dedicated board of trustees.

== Testing programs ==
- Independent School Entrance Examination (ISEE) - entrance exam for private school admission grades 2-12, competing with the SSAT
- Comprehensive Testing Program (CTP) - grade 3-12 annual standardized assessments for class and national comparison, with separate subtests covering verbal and quantitative reasoning, reading, listening, vocabulary, writing, mathematics, and science. Test editions are numbered (i.e. CTP 2, CTP 3, etc.), with the most recent one being the CTP 5.

In 2011, about 7000 (or 17%) of tested students had incorrect scores due to an error in use of a scoring key. Commenting on the effect in the New York Times, David F. Clune, president of ERB, said, “It is a lesson we all learn at some point — that life isn’t fair.” Errors in scoring had affected a smaller number of students at other testing organizations, most notably with an error in the scoring of 4000 students in the October 2005 administration of the SAT.
