= The Albany Academy =

Independent college prep school in Albany, New York, US

Albany Academy

Location
- 135 Academy Road; Albany, New York 12208; United States

Information
- Type: Private, College-prep, Day
- Motto: Exceptional Beyond Measure
- Established: 1813; 213 years ago
- Sister school: Albany Academy for Girls
- CEEB code: 330035
- Head of school: Michael G. Turner
- Faculty: 50+ teachers
- Grades: P–12
- Gender: Coeducational
- Campus size: 55 acres
- Campus type: Urban
- Colors: Red and Black
- Affiliation: New York State Association of Independent Schools
- Website: www.albanyacademy.org

Albany Academy is an independent college preparatory day school in Albany, New York. It enrolls students from Prekindergaten (age 4) to Grade 12. It was established in 1813 by a charter signed by Mayor Philip Schuyler Van Rensselaer and the city council of Albany. In July 2007, the once separate Albany Academy and Albany Academy for Girls merged into The Albany Academies. In 2024, the school launched a unifying brand effort as "Albany Academy."

== History ==
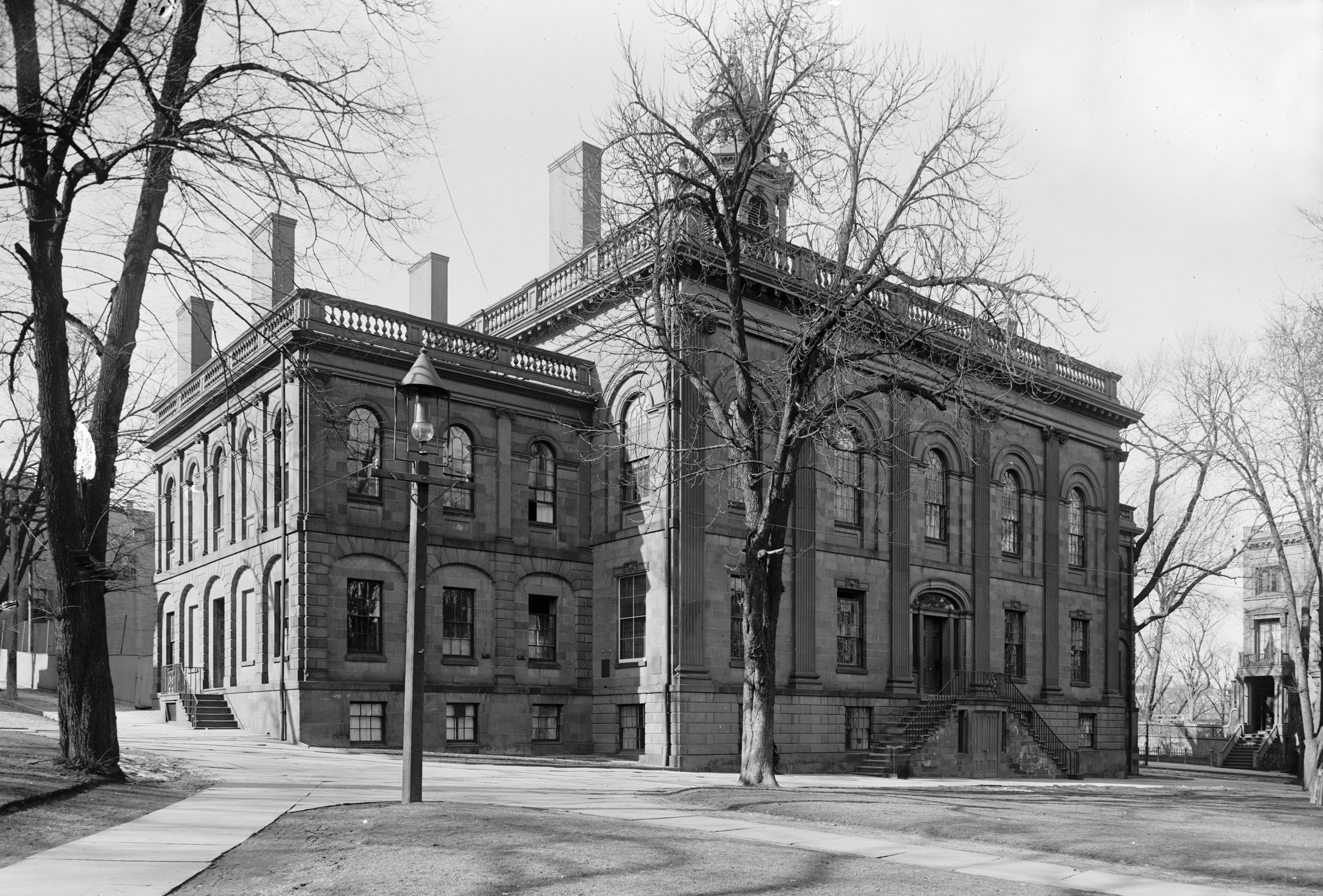
The Old Academy Building, now the Joseph Henry Memorial

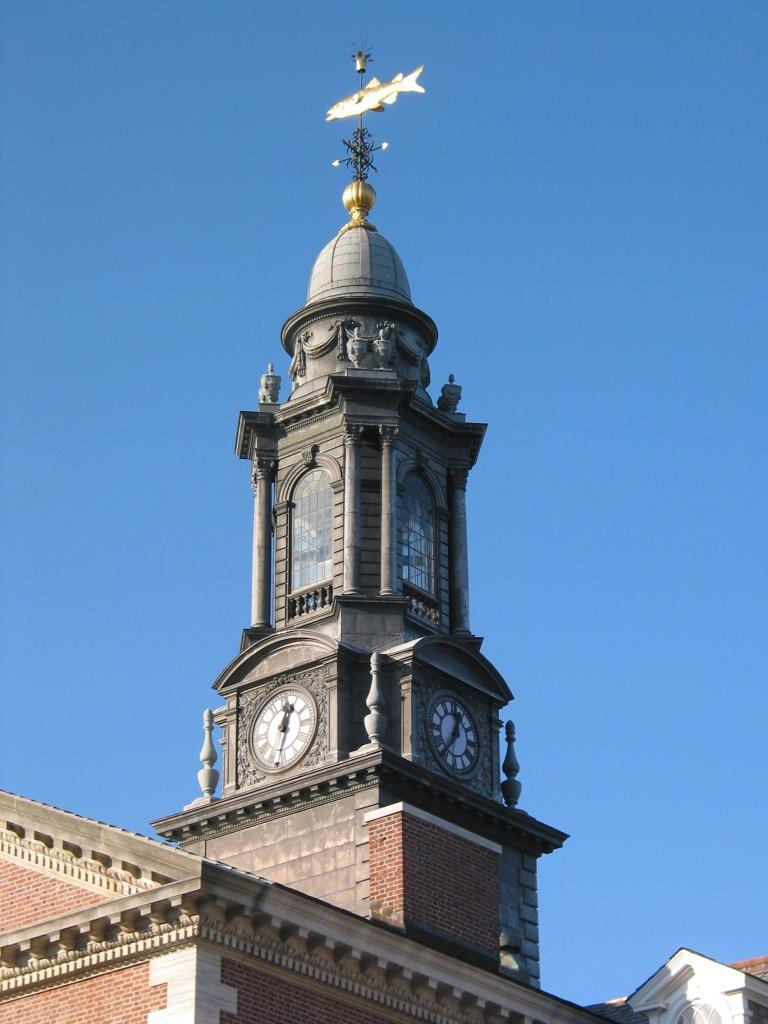
The academy's cupola rises above the main building is topped with a fish and pumpkin.

The Albany Academy is the oldest day school for boys in New York state's Capital Region. The academy was chartered in March 1813 to educate the sons of Albany's political elite and rapidly growing merchant class. In the census three years prior, Albany was the tenth-largest city in the United States, and would remain so through the 1850s due to the prominence of the Erie Canal.

Classes began within months after the charter was granted, offering a college preparatory track including intensive study of Ancient Greek, and Latin and an arithmetic-based track to prepare young men for Albany's role as a center of commerce. Two years later, in 1815, a purpose-built building was completed in present-day Academy Park, adjacent to the New York State Capitol. The Federal-style building, now known as the Old Albany Academy Building and headquarters of the City School District of Albany, was designed by renowned Albany architect Philip Hooker. The building is listed in the National Register of Historic Places.

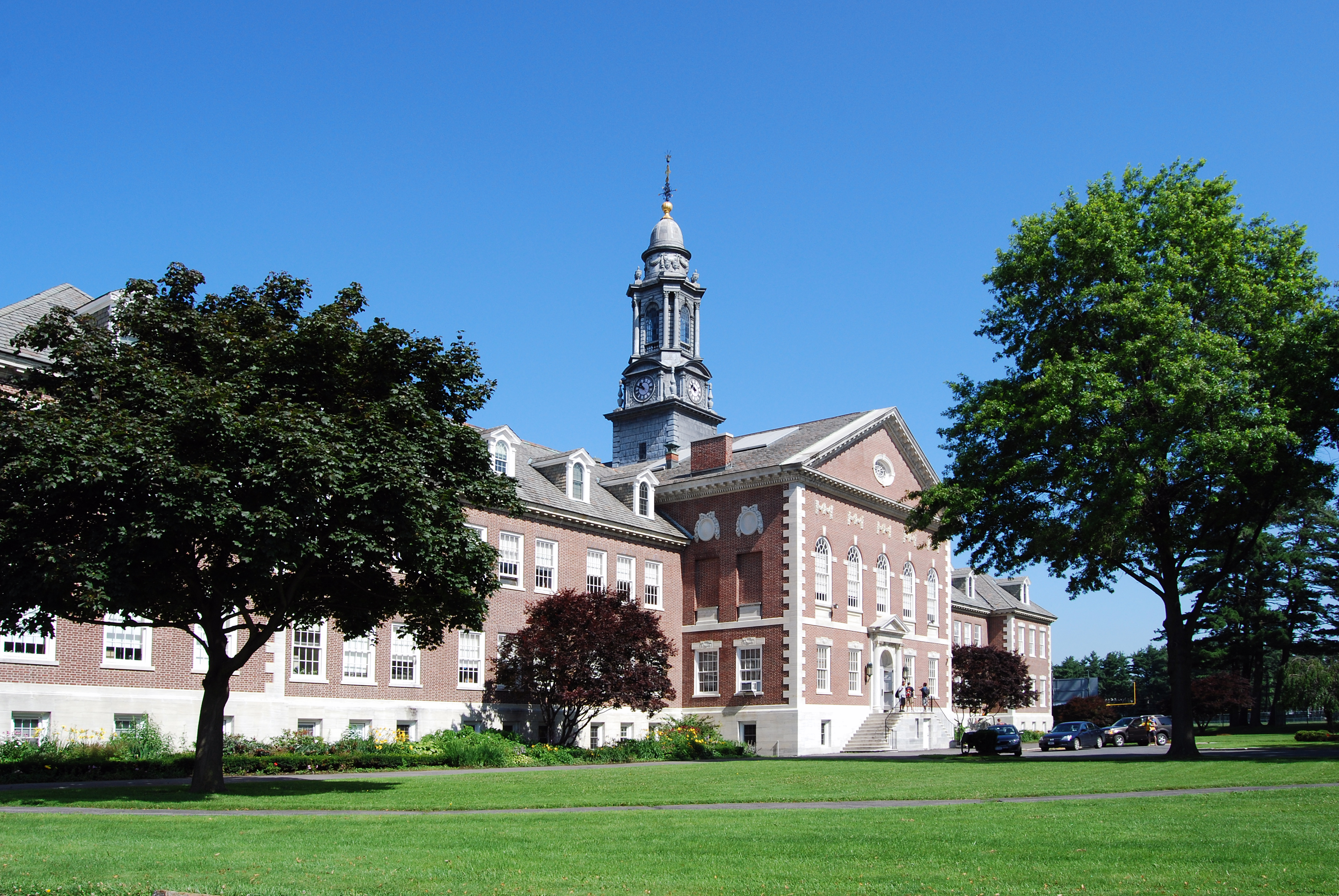
Current Academy Building

In 1870, in response to a lack of military preparation institutions in the north during the American Civil War, the Albany Academy adopted the Battalion Leadership Program, instructing the "cadets" in military procedure and the art of leadership. In 2005, the school ended compulsory involvement in the program in favor of a House-based leadership program commonly found in English preparatory schools.

In 1931, the school moved from its original downtown building in present-day Academy Park to its current location on the corner of Hackett Boulevard and Academy Road, in the University Heights section of Albany. Designed by Marcus T. Reynolds in the neo-Georgian style, the building incorporates many elements of the Old Academy building, namely the main entryway and cupola. The school stands approximately two miles from the city center. The red-brick Academy building's marble cornerstone was laid by the then-governor of New York and future president Franklin D. Roosevelt.

In 2005, The Albany Academy ended its longstanding Army JROTC program.

In July 2007, the board of trustees announced that The Albany Academy and Albany Academy for Girls would merge into The Albany Academies.

== Accreditation and memberships ==
The Albany Academies are accredited by the New York State Association of Independent Schools and recognized by the Regents of the State of New York.

== See also ==
- Albany Academy for Girls
- The Albany Academies
- Old Albany Academy Building
